= Puri–Shalimar Express =

Train in India

Shalimar - Puri Express

Overview
- Service type: Express
- Status: Active
- Locale: West Bengal and Odisha
- First service: 24 May 2026; 5 months ago
- Current operator: South Eastern Railway (SER)

Route
- Termini: Shalimar (SHM); Puri (PURI)
- Stops: 11
- Distance travelled: 497 km (309 mi)
- Average journey time: 8h 50m
- Service frequency: Weekly
- Train number: 18039 / 18040

On-board services
- Classes: General Unreserved, Sleeper Class, AC 3rd Tier, AC 2 Tier
- Seating arrangements: Yes
- Sleeping arrangements: Yes
- Catering facilities: Pantry Car
- Observation facilities: Large windows
- Baggage facilities: No
- Other facilities: Below the seats

Technical
- Rolling stock: ICF coach
- Track gauge: 1,676 mm (5 ft 6 in)
- Electrification: 25 kV 50 Hz AC Overhead line
- Operating speed: 130 km/h (81 mph) maximum, 56 km/h (35 mph) average including halts.
- Track owner: Indian Railways

The 18039 / 18040 Shalimar–Puri Express is an express train belonging to South Eastern Railway zone that runs between the city Shalimar of West Bengal and Puri of Odisha in India.

It operates as train number 18039 from Shalimar to Puri and as train number 18040 in the reverse direction, serving the states of Odisha and West Bengal.

== Services ==
• 18039/ Shalimar–Puri Express has an average speed of 56 km/h and covers 497 km in 8h 50m.

• 18040/ Puri–Shalimar Express has an average speed of 52 km/h and covers 497 km in 9h 30m.

== Route and halts ==
The Important Halts of the train are :

- Shalimar
- Santragachi Junction
- Kharagpur Junction
- Balasore
- Bhadrak
- Jajpur Keonjhar Road
- Cuttack Junction
- Bhubaneswar
- Khurda Road Junction
- Malatipatpur
- Puri

== Schedule ==
• 18039 - 9:25 PM (Sunday) [Shalimar]

• 18040 - 11:20 PM (Monday) [Puri]

== Coach composition ==
1. General Unreserved - 4
2. Sleeper Class - 9
3. AC 3 Class Tier - 3
4. AC 2 Class Tier - 2

== Traction ==
As the entire route is fully electrified it is hauled by a Howrah Shed-based WAP-7 electric locomotive from Shalimar to Puri and vice versa.

== Rake reversal or rake share ==
No rake reversal or rake share.

== See also ==
Trains from Shalimar :

1. Aranyak Express
2. Shalimar–Bhuj Weekly Superfast Express
3. Shalimar–Secunderabad AC Superfast Express
4. Charlapalli–Shalimar Amrit Bharat Express
5. Shalimar–Lokmanya Tilak Terminus Express

Trains from Puri :

1. Puri–Shalimar Garib Rath Express
2. Bhanjpur–Puri Express
3. Puri–Kamakhya Weekly Express (via Adra)
4. Puri–Rourkela Vande Bharat Express
5. Nandan Kanan Express

== Notes ==
a. Runs a day in a week with both directions.
