= Rahama railway station =

Railway station in Odisha, India

Rahama

General information
- Location: Rahama, Odisha; India
- Coordinates: 20°17′52″N 86°24′08″E
- System: Indian Railways station
- Owner: Ministry of Railways, Indian Railways
- Line: Cuttack–Paradip line
- Platforms: 2
- Tracks: 2

Construction
- Structure type: Standard (on ground)
- Parking: No

Other information
- Status: Functioning
- Station code: RHMA
- Zone(s): East Coast Railway
- Division(s): Khurda Road
Location
- Location within India Location within Odisha

Rahama railway station is a railway station on the East Coast Railway network in the state of Odisha, India. It serves Rahama village. Its code is RHMA. It has two platforms. Passenger, MEMU, Express trains halt at Rahama railway station.

== Major trains ==
- Santragachi–Paradeep Express
- Paradeep−Puri Intercity Express
- Paradeep–Visakhapatnam Express

== See also ==
- Jagatsinghpur district
