= Janakadeipur railway station =

Railway station in Odisha

Janakadeipur

General information
- Location: Puri-Balanga Road, Janakadeipur, Puri district, Odisha; India
- Coordinates: 19°53′21″N 85°49′10″E
- Elevation: 10 m (33 ft)
- System: Indian Railways
- Owner: Indian Railways
- Line: Kharagpur–Puri line
- Platforms: 2
- Tracks: Broad gauge 5 ft 6 in (1,676 mm)

Construction
- Structure type: Standard (on-ground station)

Other information
- Status: Functioning
- Station code: JKDP
- Zone(s): East Coast Railway
- Division(s): Khurda Road

History
- Opened: 1897
- Former names: East Coast State Railway

Services
Preceding station	Indian Railways	Following station
Sakhigopal towards Kharagpur Junction	East Coast Railway zone Khurda Road–Puri section	Malatipatpur towards Puri
Location
- Location within Odisha Location within India

Janakadeipur railway station is a railway station on Kharagpur–Puri line in East Coast Railway zone under Khurda Road railway division of Indian Railways. The station is situated beside Puri-Balanga Road at Malatipatapur in Puri district of the Indian state of Odisha.

== History ==
As the branch of Howrah–Chennai main line, the Khurda Road–Puri section was opened to traffic on 1 February 1897. The complete track became doubled in July 2015.
