= Raghunathpur railway station =

Railway station on the East Coast Railway network in India

Raghunathpur

General information
- Location: Raghunathpur, Odisha; India
- Coordinates: 20°21′05″N 86°09′03″E
- System: Indian Railways station
- Owner: Ministry of Railways, Indian Railways
- Line: Cuttack–Paradip line
- Platforms: 3
- Tracks: 3

Construction
- Structure type: Standard (on ground)
- Parking: No

Other information
- Status: Functioning
- Station code: RCTC
- Zone(s): East Coast Railway
- Division(s): Khurda Road
Location
- Location within India Location within Odisha

Raghunathpur railway station is a railway station on the East Coast Railway network in the state of Odisha, India. It serves Raghunathpur village. Its code is RCTC. It has three platforms. Passenger, MEMU, Express trains halt at Raghunathpur railway station.

== Major trains ==
- Santragachi–Paradeep Express
- Paradeep−Puri Intercity Express

== See also ==
- Jagatsinghpur district
