= Sakhigopal railway station =

Railway station on the East Coast Railway network in India

Sakhigopal

General information
- Location: Sakhigopal, Odisha; India
- Coordinates: 19°56′35″N 85°48′58″E
- System: Indian Railways station
- Owner: Ministry of Railways, Indian Railways
- Line: Kharagpur–Puri line
- Platforms: 4
- Tracks: 4

Construction
- Structure type: Standard (on ground)
- Parking: No

Other information
- Status: Functioning
- Station code: SIL
- Zone(s): East Coast Railway
- Division(s): Khurda Road
Location
- Location within India Location within Odisha

Sakhigopal railway station is a railway station on the East Coast Railway network in the state of Odisha, India. It serves Sakhigopal village. Its code is SIL. It has four platforms. Passenger, MEMU, Express trains halt at Sakhigopal railway station.

== Major trains ==
- Puri Baidyanath Dham Express
- Puri–Kamakhya Weekly Express (via Howrah)
- Sri Jagannath Express
- Puri–Howrah Express
- Kalinga Utkal Express
- Puri–Barbil Express
- Paradeep–Puri Intercity Express
- Howrah–Puri Express
- Puri–Ahmedabad Express
- Puri–Ahmedabad Weekly Express
- Puri–Jodhpur Express
- Puri–Okha Dwarka Express
- Gandhidham–Puri Weekly Express
- Neelachal Express
- Puri–Tirupati Express
- Puri-Chennai Express

== See also ==
- Puri district
