= Jenapur Road railway station =

Railway station in Odisha

Jenapur Road

General information
- Location: Kharikera, Jenapur, Puri district, Odisha; India
- Coordinates: 20°01′06″N 85°47′12″E
- Elevation: 10 m (33 ft)
- System: Indian Railways
- Owner: Indian Railways
- Line: Kharagpur–Puri line
- Platforms: 2
- Tracks: Broad gauge 5 ft 6 in (1,676 mm)

Construction
- Structure type: Standard (on-ground station)

Other information
- Status: Functioning
- Station code: JPDR
- Zone(s): East Coast Railway
- Division(s): Khurda Road

History
- Opened: 1897
- Former names: East Coast State Railway

Services
Preceding station	Indian Railways	Following station
Delang towards Kharagpur Junction	East Coast Railway zone Khurda Road–Puri section	Bir Purushottampur towards Puri
Location
- Location within Odisha Location within India

Jenapur Road railway station is a railway station on Kharagpur–Puri line in East Coast Railway zone under Khurda Road railway division of Indian Railways. The station is situated at Kharikera, Jenapur in Puri district of the Indian state of Odisa.

== History ==
As the branch of Howrah–Chennai main line, the Khurda Road–Puri section was opened to traffic on 1 February 1897. The complete track became doubled in July 2015.
