= Santragachi–Paradeep Express =

Passenger train in India

Paradeep–Santragachi Junction Express
Overview
- Service type: Express
- Current operator: East Coast Railway zone

Route
- Termini: Paradeep; Santragachi Junction
- Stops: 15
- Distance travelled: 485 km (301 mi)
- Average journey time: 8 hours 2 mins
- Service frequency: Weekly
- Train number: 22814 / 22813

On-board services
- Classes: General unreserved, AC 2 Tier, AC 3 Tier, sleeper class
- Seating arrangements: Yes
- Sleeping arrangements: Yes
- Catering facilities: No
- Observation facilities: Rake sharing with 22801/02 Visakhapatnam–Chennai Central Express & 22809/10 Paradeep–Visakhapatnam Express

Technical
- Rolling stock: Standard Indian Railways coaches
- Track gauge: 1,676 mm (5 ft 6 in)
- Operating speed: 61 km/h (38 mph)

The 22814 / 13 Paradeep–Santragachi Junction Express is an express train belonging to Indian Railways East Coast Railway zone that runs between Paradeep and Santragachi Junction in India.

It operates as train number 22814 from Paradeep to Santragachi Junction and as train number 22813 in the reverse direction, serving the states of Odisha & West Bengal.

== Coaches ==
The 22814 / 13 Paradeep–Santragachi Junction Express has one AC 2 tier, three AC 3 tier, seven sleeper coaches, six general unreserved & two SLR (seating with luggage rake) coaches . It does not carry a pantry car.

As is customary with most train services in India, coach composition may be amended at the discretion of Indian Railways depending on demand.

== Service ==
The 22814 Paradeep–Santragachi Junction Express covers the distance of 485 km (301 mi) in 7 hours 15 mins (67 km/h) and in 8 hours 50 mins as the 22813 Santragachi Junction–Paradeep Express (55 km/h).

As the average speed of the train is higher than 55 km/h (34 mph), as per railway rules, its fare includes a Superfast surcharge.

== Timetable ==
22814 – Paradeep to Santragachi every Monday

Station name	Arrival time	Distance (km)	Day
Paradeep	23:55 (Source)	0	Day 1
Rahama	00:14	24	Day 2
Raghunathpur (RCTC)	00:38	52	Day 2
Cuttack Junction	1:37 AM	83	Day 2
Jajpur K Road	2:35 AM	155	Day 2
Baitarani Road (BTV)	2:47 AM	167	Day 2
Bhadrak	3:48 AM	199	Day 2
Soro (SORO)	4:11 AM	228	Day 2
Balasore	4:36 AM	261	Day 2
Jaleswar	5:09 AM	308	Day 2
Kharagpur Junction	6:10 AM	379	Day 2
Santragachi Junction	8:45 AM	487	Day 2

22813 – Santragachi to Paradeep every Tuesday

Station name	Arrival time	Distance (km)	Day
Santragachi Junction	20:25 (Source)	0	Day 1
Kharagpur Junction	21:51	108	Day 1
Jaleswar	22:55	179	Day 1
Balasore	22:42	227	Day 1
Soro (SORO)	00:06	260	Day 2
Bhadrak	00:45	289	Day 2
Baitarani Road (BTV)	1:11 AM	321	Day 2
Jajpur K Road	1:23 AM	332	Day 2
Cuttack Junction	2:30 AM	404	Day 2
Raghunathpur (RCTC)	3:04	436	Day 2
Rahama (RHMA)	3:17	464	Day 2
Paradeep	4:30 AM	487	Day 2

== Traction ==
As the route is electrified, a Santragachi Junction-based WAP-4 electric locomotive pulls the train to its destination.
