= MWQ =

MWQ or mwq may refer to:

- MWQ, the IATA code for Magway Airport, Myanmar
- MWQ, the station code for Motari Halt railway station, Odisha, India
- mwq, the ISO 639-3 code for Kʼchò language, Burma
