= Samudra Kanya Express =

Passenger train in India

Overview
- Service type: Express
- First service: 12 December 2010; 15 years ago
- Current operator: East Coast Railway zone

Route
- Termini: Puri; Digha
- Stops: 23
- Distance travelled: 547 km (340 mi)
- Average journey time: 10 hours 7 mins
- Service frequency: Weekly
- Train number: 22889 / 22890

On-board services
- Classes: AC 2 Tier, AC 3 Tier, Sleeper class & General Unreserved
- Seating arrangements: Yes
- Sleeping arrangements: Yes

Technical
- Rolling stock: Standard Indian Railways coaches
- Track gauge: 1,676 mm (5 ft 6 in)
- Operating speed: 56 km/h (35 mph)

22889 / 90 Samudra Kanya Express is an express train belonging to Indian Railways East Coast Railway zone that run between Puri and Digha in India.

== Service ==
It operates as train number 22889 from Puri to Digha and as train number 22890 in the reverse direction, serving the states of Odisha & West Bengal. The train covers the distance of 547 km (340 mi) in 10 hours 07 mins approximately at a speed of (56 km/h (35 mph)).

== Coaches ==
The 22889 / 90 Samudra Kanya Express has one AC 2-tier, seven AC 3-tier, six sleeper class, two general unreserved, one SLR (seating with luggage rake) and one generator coaches. It doesn't carry a pantry car.

As with most train services in India, coach composition may be amended at the discretion of Indian Railways depending on demand.

== Routing ==
The 22889 / 90 Samudra Kanya Express runs from Puri via Khurda Road Junction, Bhubaneswar, Cuttack Junction, Jajpur Keonjhar Road, Bhadrak, Balasore, Jaleswar, Kharagpur Junction, Panskura junction, Tamluk junction, Kanthi railway station to Digha.

== Traction ==
A Visakhapatnam-based electric WAP-7 loco pulls the train to its destination.

== Rake sharing ==
The train shares its rake with Puri Baidyanath Dham Express and 12895/12896 Shalimar Puri Express.

Train No.	Train Name	Departs	Arrival
22890	Samudra Kanya Express	PURI@21:05 SAT	DGHA@6:35 SUN
22889	Samudra Kanya Express	DGHA@17:15 SUN	PURI@2:55 MON
18449	Puri Baidyanath Dham Express	PURI@14:55 MON	PNBE@9:35 TUE
18450	Puri Baidyanath Dham Express	PNBE@8:45 WED	PURI@2:55THU
12896	Puri–Shalimar Weekly SF Express	PURI@22:10 THU	SHM@6:55 FRI
12895	Shalimar–Puri Superfast Express	SHM@20:55 FRI	PURI@5:10 SAT
