= Howrah–Puri Shatabdi Express =

Shatabdi Express train in India

Puri - Howrah Junction Shatabdi Express
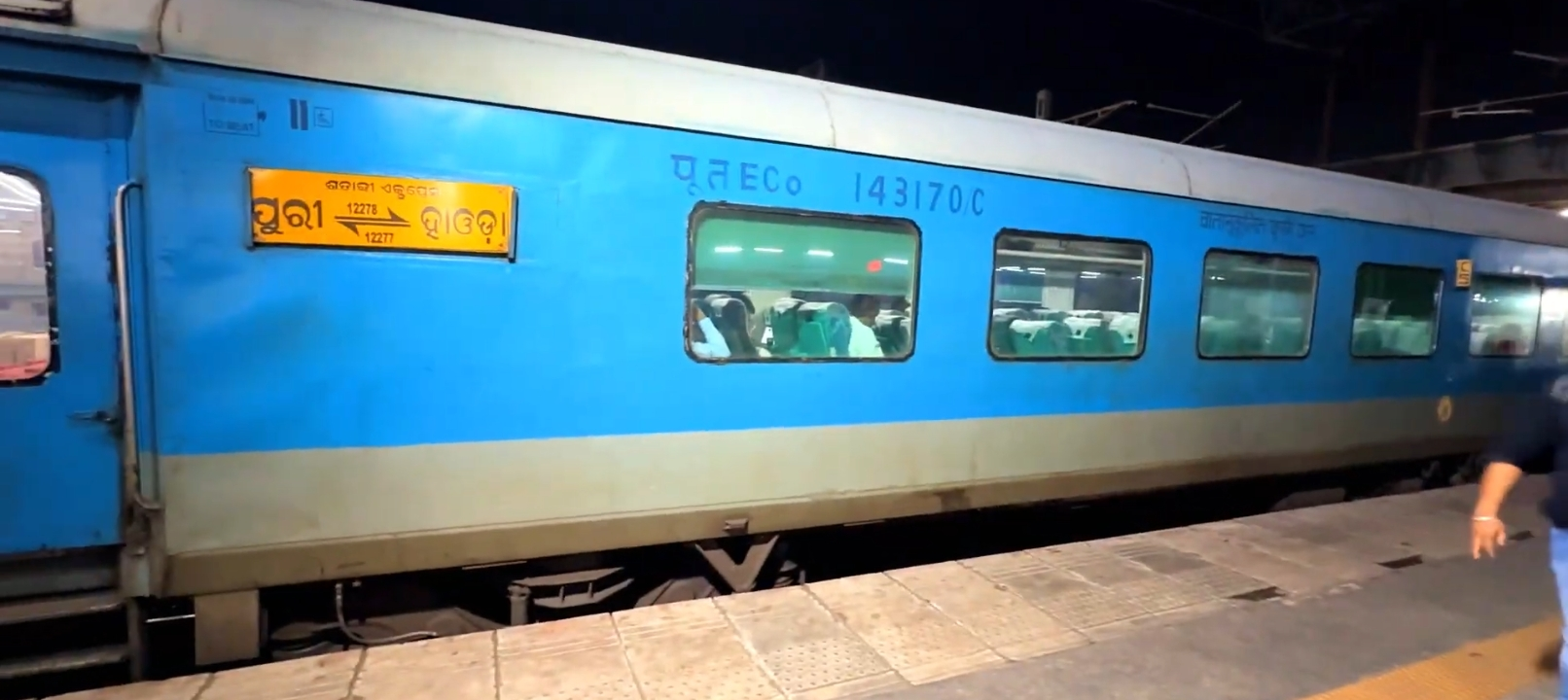
- Puri shatabdi express At Cuttack Junction

Overview
- Service type: Shatabdi Express
- First service: December 7, 2010; 15 years ago as Puri - Howrah Duronto Express, changed to Shatabdi Express on February 8, 2013; 13 years ago
- Current operator: East Coast Railway zone

Route
- Termini: Puri; Howrah
- Stops: 5
- Distance travelled: 498.891 km (310 mi) (as per Khurda Road Division map and East Coast Railway map on official website of East Coast Railway. For earlier part of journey: Kharagpur Division map and South Eastern Railway map on official website of South Eastern Railway) to about 502 km (312 mi) in Howrah Puri direction and about 502 Kms in opposite direction because, according to Kharagpur Division map and South Eastern Railway map on official website of South Eastern Railway, two lines are longer and one is shorter between Kharagpur and Hijli. Chargeable distance may be different.
- Average journey time: 07 hours 45 minutes
- Service frequency: Daily
- Train number: 12277 / 12278

On-board services
- Classes: Executive Class, AC Chair Car
- Seating arrangements: Yes
- Sleeping arrangements: No
- Auto-rack arrangements: No
- Catering facilities: Yes
- Observation facilities: Large windows, reading lights
- Entertainment facilities: No
- Baggage facilities: Overhead racks

Technical
- Rolling stock: LHB coach
- Track gauge: 1,676 mm (5 ft 6 in)
- Operating speed: 65 km/h (40 mph), including halts (average of both directions)
Route map
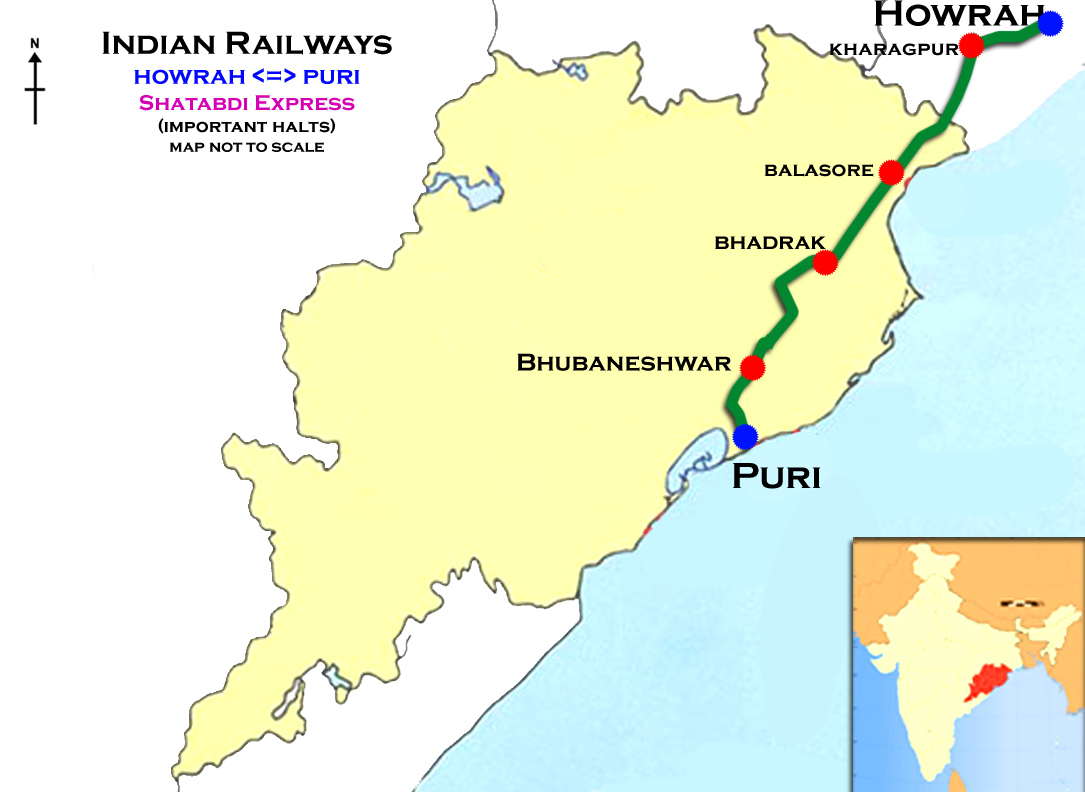

Puri-Howrah Shatabdi Express is a Shatabdi Express category type of service belonging to East Coast Railway zone that runs between Puri and Howrah in India. It was introduced as Puri - Howrah - Puri Duronto Express but its service pattern was changed to Shatabdi Express to provide commercial halts on 8 February 2013 because, Duronto Express should have had no commercial halt then but they had operational or technical halt/s if it was required or if they were required.

It operated as train number 12278 from Puri to Howrah and as train number 12277 in the reverse direction serving the states of Odisha and West Bengal. It was pulled by Indian locomotive class WAP-4, but now it is pulled by a WAP P-5 locomotive or Electric Loco Shed, Howrah WAP-7.

== Coaches ==
The 12278 / 77 Puri Howrah Shatabdi Express presently has 1 AC Executive Chair Car, 7-8 AC Chair Car (7 and sometimes 1 extra) and 2 End on Generator coaches. It does not carry a Pantry car coach but being a Shatabdi category train, catering is arranged on board the train.

As is customary with most train services in India, Coach Composition may be amended at the discretion of Indian Railways depending on demand.

	1	2	3	4	5	6	7	8	9	10	11	12
12277		SLR	C7	E1	C6	C5	C4	C3	C2	C1	CE1	EOG
12278		EOG	CE1	C1	C2	C3	C4	C5	C6	E1	C7	SLR

== Service ==
The 12278 / 12277 Puri Howrah Shatabdi Express takes 08 hours and 07 hours 30 mins during return. Real distance between Howrah and Puri is 498.891 kms (as per Khurda Road Division map and East Coast Railway map on official website of East Coast Railway. For earlier part of journey: Kharagpur Division map and South Eastern Railway map on official website of South Eastern Railway) to about 502 kms in Howrah Puri direction and about 502 Kms in opposite direction because, according to Kharagpur Division map and South Eastern Railway map on official website of South Eastern Railway, two lines are longer and one is shorter between Kharagpur and Hijli. Chargeable distance may be different.

The average speed of the train is 65 km/h including halts (average of both directions).

== Schedule ==
The schedule of this 12277/12278 Puri - Howrah Shatabdi Express is given below:-

PURI - HWH - PURI Shatabdi Express
12277		Stations	12278	
Arrival	Departure	Stations	Arrival	Departure
----	05:45	Puri	21:50	----
06:47	06:49	Bhubaneswar	20:25	20:27
07:15	07:17	Cuttack Junction	19:50	19:52
08:05	08:07	Jajpur Keonjhar Road	18:55	18:57
09:08	09:10	Bhadrak	18:23	18:25
09:50	09:55	Balasore	17:25	17:30
11:32	11:40	Kharagpur Junction	15:55	16:03
13:45	----	Howrah Junction	----	14:15

== Routeing ==
The 12278 / 77 Puri Howrah Shatabdi Express runs from Puri via Bhubaneswar, Cuttack, Balasore, Kharagpur to Howrah Junction.

== Operation ==
As per information on 4 Aug 2022, wef 2 Oct, 2022,12278 - will leave Puri at 5:45 AM IST and reach Howrah Junction same Day at 13:45 PM 12277 - leave Howrah Junction at 14:15 PM IST and reach Puri on same Day at 21:50 PM IST

Being a Shatabdi class train, it returns to its originating station Puri at the end of the day.
