= Howrah–Puri Vande Bharat Express =

Vande Bharat Express train route in India

Howrah - Puri Vande Bharat Express
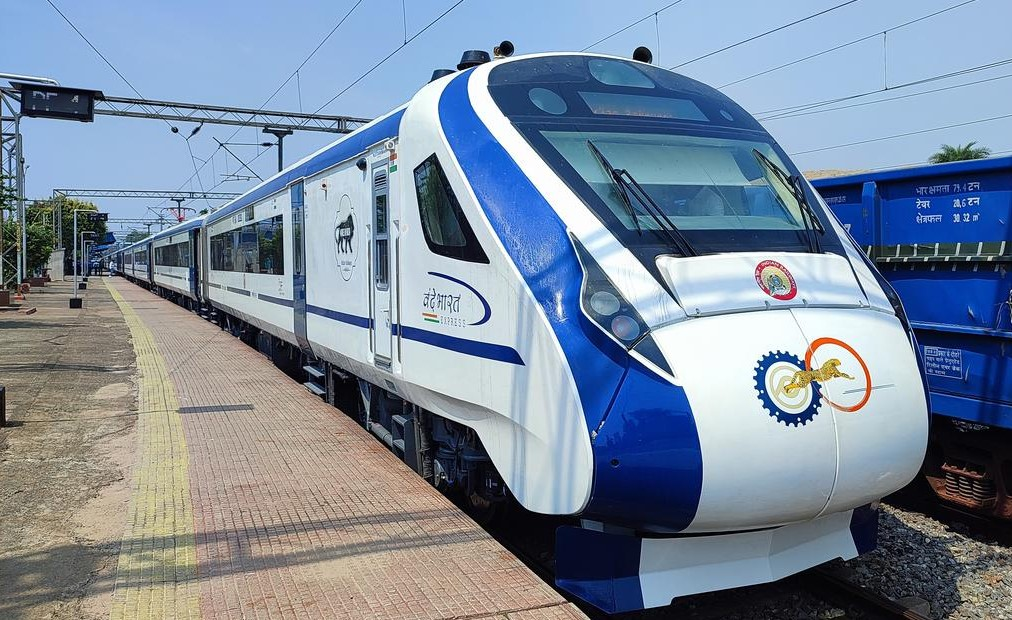
- Howrah Puri Vande Bharat Express standing at Bhadrak

Overview
- Service type: Vande Bharat Express
- Locale: West Bengal and Odisha
- First service: 18 May 2023 (Inaugural run); 20 May 2023; 3 years ago (Commercial run)
- Current operator: South Eastern Railways (SER)

Route
- Termini: Howrah Junction (HWH); Puri (PURI)
- Stops: 7
- Distance travelled: 500 km (311 mi)
- Average journey time: 06 hrs 20 mins
- Service frequency: Six days a week (Note: Except Thursdays)
- Train number: 22895 / 22896
- Lines used: Howrah–Kharagpur line Kharagpur–Puri line

On-board services
- Classes: AC Chair Car, AC Executive Chair Car
- Seating arrangements: Airline style; Rotatable seats
- Sleeping arrangements: No
- Catering facilities: On-board catering
- Observation facilities: Large windows in all coaches
- Entertainment facilities: On-board WiFi; Infotainment System; Electric outlets; Reading light; Seat Pockets; Bottle Holder; Tray Table
- Baggage facilities: Overhead racks
- Other facilities: Kavach

Technical
- Rolling stock: Vande Bharat 2.0 (Last service: May 14 2025); Vande Bharat 3.0 (First service: May 16 2025)
- Track gauge: Indian gauge 1,676 mm (5 ft 6 in) broad gauge
- Electrification: 25 kV 50 Hz AC Overhead line
- Operating speed: 78 km/h (48 mph) (Avg.)
- Average length: 480 metres (1,570 ft) (20 coaches)
- Track owner: Indian Railways
- Rake maintenance: Santragachi Jn (SRC)

The 22895/22896 Howrah - Puri Vande Bharat Express is India's 16th Vande Bharat Express train, connecting the Capital of West Bengal, Kolkata with the city of Puri in Odisha via Kharagpur, Balasore, Cuttack & Bhubaneswar. It is the West Bengal's second and Odisha's first semi-high speed Vande Bharat express train. It was inaugurated on 18 May 2023.

== Overview ==
This train is operated by Indian Railways, connecting Howrah Jn, Kharagpur Jn, Balasore, Bhadrak, Jajpur Keonjhar Road, Cuttack Jn, Bhubaneswar, Khurda Road Jn and Puri. It is operated with train numbers 22895/22896 on 6 days a week basis.

== Rakes ==
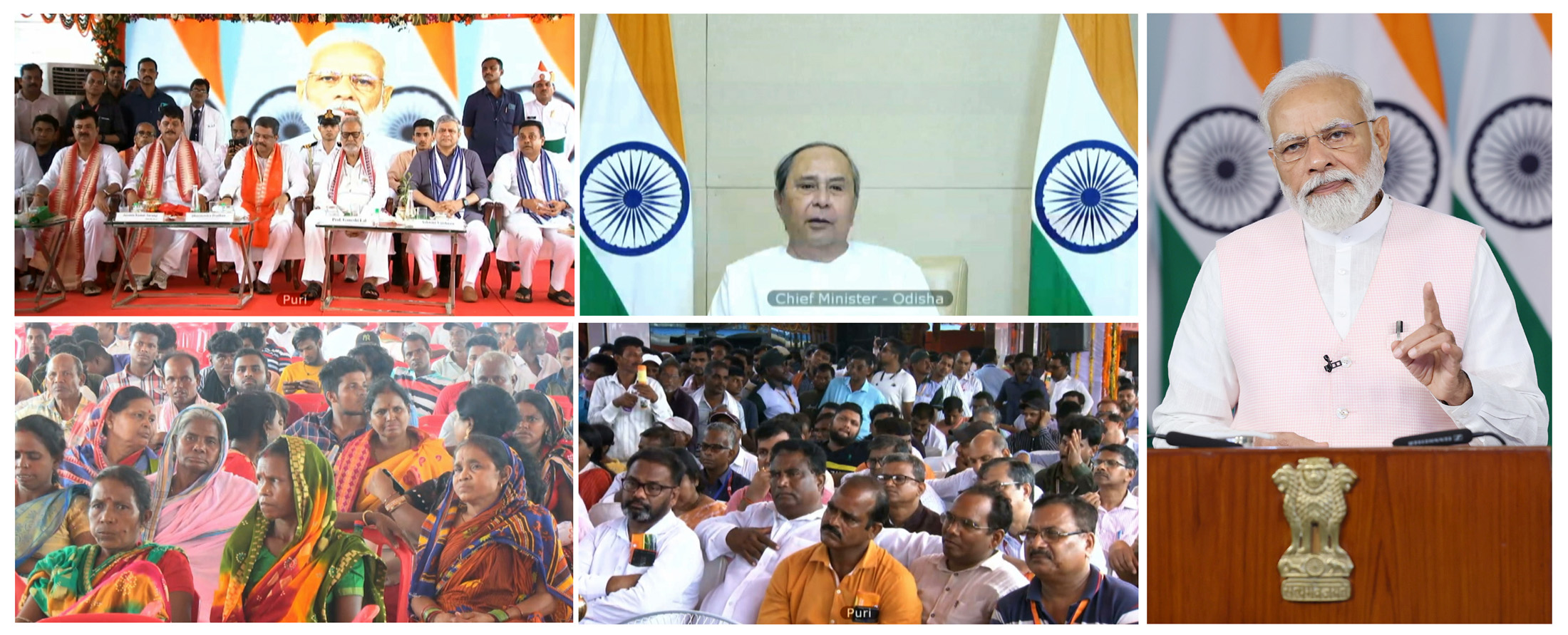
Prime Minister Narendra Modi inaugurating Howrah-Puri Vande Bharat Express by flagging off on 18 May 2023.

It was the fourteenth 2nd Generation Vande Bharat Express train and was designed and manufactured by the Integral Coach Factory (ICF) at Perambur, Chennai under the Make in India initiative.

=== Coach augmentation ===
As per latest updates, this express train will be augmented with 4 additional AC coaches, thereby running with Vande Bharat 3.0 trainset W.E.F. 16 May 2025 in order to enhance passenger capacity on this popular route.

== Service ==
The 22895/22896 Howrah Jn - Puri Vande Bharat Express operates six days a week except Thursdays, covering a distance of 500 km (310 mi) in a travel time of 6 hours with an average speed of 75 km/h (47 mph). The service has 7 intermediate stops. The Maximum Permissible Speed is 130 km/h (81 mph).

== Incidents ==
On 21 May 2023, suddenly a tree branch fell on the windshield of the driver cab of the train, near Jajpur Keonjhar Road, on the bridge near Baitarani river in Odisha during a thunderstorm. The train was immediately stopped, and the train was then taken to Howrah with a diesel engine (WDP-4D). After the accident the nose of the train was severely damaged which was removed at the spot. This caused its delay of 5 hours and 38 minutes, and its journey was cancelled on 22 May 2023. For repairing purposes, it was taken to Santragachi Junction in turn of taken to Howrah Junction

== See also ==
- Vande Bharat Express
- Tejas Express
- Gatimaan Express
- Howrah railway station
- Puri railway station
