= Kandarpur railway station =

Railway station on the East Coast Railway network in India

Kandarpur

General information
- Location: Kandarpur, Odisha; India
- Coordinates: 20°23′49″N 86°01′04″E
- System: Indian Railways station
- Owner: Ministry of Railways, Indian Railways
- Line: Cuttack–Paradip line
- Platforms: 2
- Tracks: 2

Construction
- Structure type: Standard (on ground)
- Parking: No

Other information
- Status: Functioning
- Station code: KDRP
- Zone(s): East Coast Railway
- Division(s): Khurda Road
Location
- Location within India Location within Odisha

Kandarpur railway station is a railway station on the East Coast Railway network in the state of Odisha, India. It serves Kandarpur village. Its code is KDRP. It has two platforms. Passenger, MEMU, Express trains halt at Kandarpur railway station.

== Major trains ==
- Paradeep−Puri Intercity Express

== See also ==
- Cuttack district
