= Visakhapatnam–Chennai Central Express =

Passenger train in India

Overview
- Service type: Express
- First service: 23 January 2015; 11 years ago 15 December 2012; 13 years ago
- Current operators: South Coast Railway zone & South Coast Railway zone

Route
- Termini: Visakhapatnam; Chennai Central
- Stops: 22801 /02 Visakhapatnam Chennai Central SF Express – 14 and 22869 / 70 Visakhapatnam Chennai Central SF Express – 11
- Distance travelled: 781 km (485 mi)
- Average journey time: 13 hours 30 minutes for both trains
- Service frequency: Weekly
- Train numbers: 22801 / 22802 and 22869 / 70

On-board services
- Classes: AC 2 tier, AC 3 tier, sleeper class, general unreserved
- Seating arrangements: Yes
- Sleeping arrangements: Yes
- Catering facilities: No

Technical
- Rolling stock: Standard Indian Railways coaches
- Track gauge: 1,676 mm (5 ft 6 in)
- Operating speed: 56.5 km/h (35 mph) 57 km/h (35 mph)
- Rake sharing: 22801/02 Rake sharing with 22809/10 Paradeep–Visakhapatnam Express & 22813/14 Santragachi–Paradeep Express; 22869/70 Rake sharing with 18503/04 Sainagar Shirdi–Visakhapatnam Express
Route map
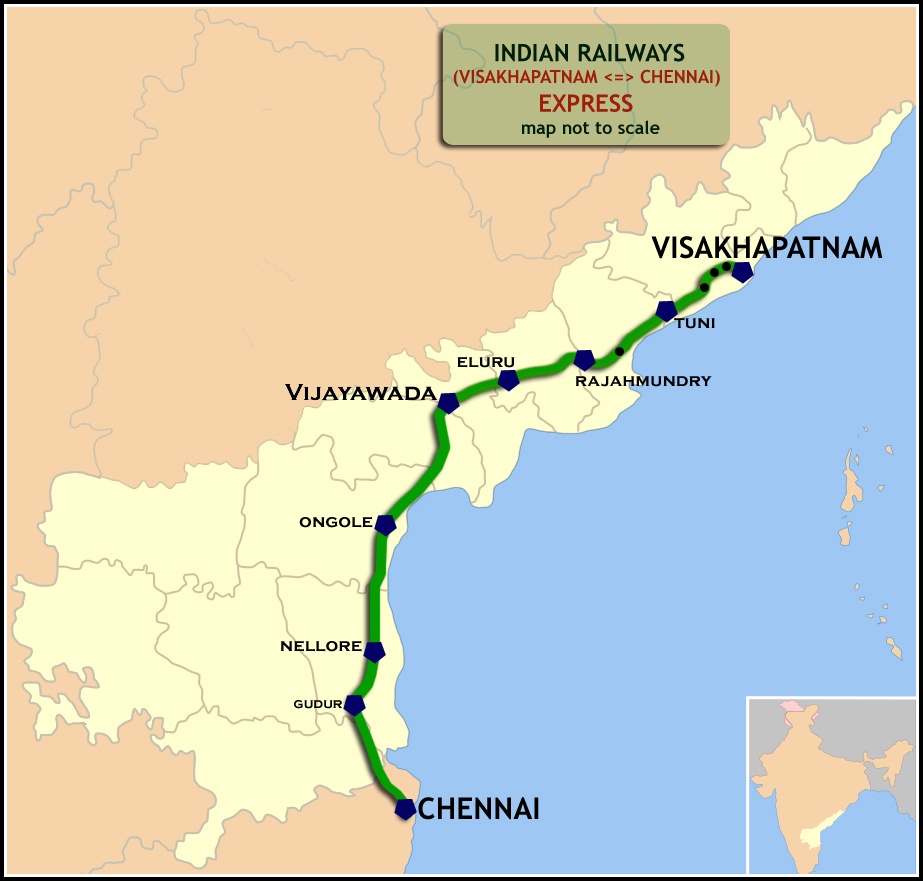

The 22801 / 02 Visakhapatnam–Chennai Central Express is an express train belonging to East Coast Railway zone and 22869/70 Visakhapatnam–Chennai Central Superfast Express train belonging to South Coast Railway zone of Indian Railways that runs between Visakhapatnam and Chennai Central in India.

It operates as train number 22801 from Visakhapatnam to Chennai Centralvia New Guntur and as train number 22802 in the reverse direction. Similarly train number 22869 from Visakhapatnam to Chennai Central are serving the states of Andhra Pradesh & Tamil Nadu.

== Coaches ==
The 22801 / 02 Visakhapatnam–Chennai Central Express has one AC 2-tier, three AC 3-tier, 7 sleeper class, six general unreserved & two SLR (seating with luggage rake) coaches. It does not carry a pantry car.

Similarly the 22869 / 70 Visakhapatnam–Chennai Central SF Express has one AC 2-tier, four AC 3-tier, 8 sleeper class, six general unreserved & two SLR (seating with luggage rake) coaches. It does not carry a pantry car.

== Service ==
The 22801 Visakhapatnam–Chennai Central Superfast Express covers the distance of 781 km (485 mi) in 14 hours 35 mins (55 km/h) & in 13 hours 50 mins as the 22802 Chennai Central–Visakhapatnam Express (58 km/h).

The 22869 Visakhapatnam–Chennai Central Superfast Express covers the distance of 781 km (485 mi) in 13 hours 50 mins (56 km/h) & in 13 hours 15 mins as the 22870 Chennai Central–Visakhapatnam Express (59 km/h).

== Route ==
The 22801 / 02 Visakhapatnam–Chennai Central Superfast Express runs from Visakhapatnam via Duvvada, Anakapalle, Annavaram, Samalkot Junction, Rajahmundry, Tadepalligudem, Eluru, Vijayawada Junction, New Guntur, Tenali Junction, Ongole, Nellore, Gudur Junction and Sullurupeta to Chennai Central. This train is maintained by East Coast Railway zone.

The 22869 / 70 Visakhapatnam–Chennai Central Superfast Express runs from Visakhapatnam via Duvvada, Anakapalle, Narsingapalli, Tuni, Samalkot Junction, Rajahmundry, Eluru, Vijayawada Junction, Ongole, Nellore and Gudur Junction to Chennai Central. This train is maintained by South Coast Railway zone.

== Traction ==
As the route is electrified, an Visakhapatnam or Vijayawada-based WAP-4 locomotive pulls the train to its destination.
