= Puri–Yesvantpur Garib Rath Express =

Train in India

Puri − Yesvantpur Junction Garib Rath Express
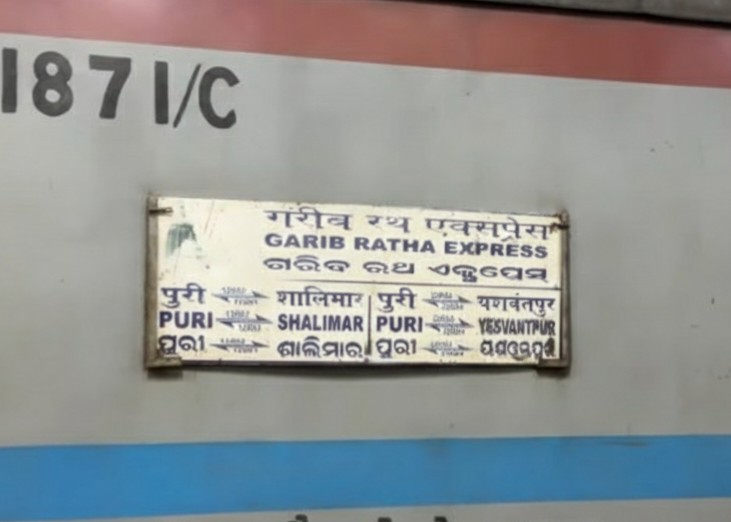
- YPR - PURI Garib Rath Express Train board

Overview
- Service type: Garib Rath Express
- First service: 20 July 2012; 13 years ago
- Current operator: East Coast Railways

Route
- Termini: Puri(PURI); Yesvantpur Junction(YPR)
- Stops: 25
- Distance travelled: 1,517 km (943 mi)
- Average journey time: 30 hours
- Service frequency: 1 day a week.
- Train number: 22883 / 22884

On-board services
- Class: AC 3 tier
- Seating arrangements: No
- Sleeping arrangements: Yes
- Auto-rack arrangements: No
- Catering facilities: No
- Observation facilities: Sharing rakes with 12881/82 Puri Howrah Garib Rath Express
- Baggage facilities: Storage space under berth

Technical
- Rolling stock: Standard Indian Railways Garib Rath Coaches
- Track gauge: 1,676 mm (5 ft 6 in)
- Electrification: Yes
- Operating speed: 110 km/h (68 mph) maximum,52 km/h (32 mph), including halts
Route map
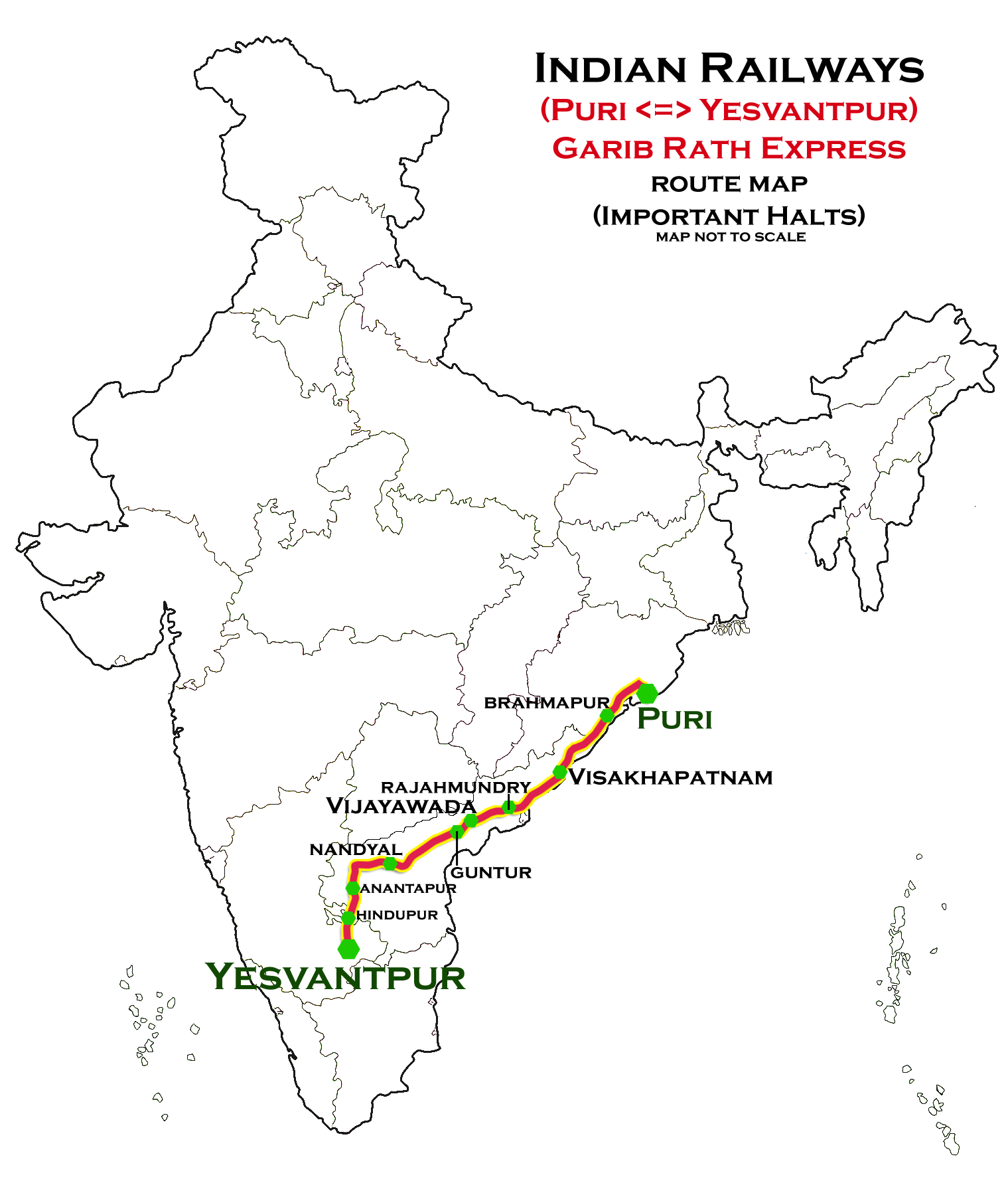

The 22883 / 84 Puri Yesvantpur Junction Garib Rath Express is a Superfast Express train of the Garib Rath series belonging to Indian Railways - East Coast Railway zone that runs between Puri and Yesvantpur Junction in India.

It operates as train number 22883 from Puri to Yesvantpur Junction and as train number 22884 in the reverse direction serving the states of Odisha, Andhra Pradesh & Karnataka.

It is part of the Garib Rath Express series launched by the former railway minister of India, Mr. Laloo Prasad Yadav

== Coaches ==
The 22883 / 84 Puri Yesvantpur Junction Garib Rath Express has 16 AC 3 tier & 2 End on Generator Coaches. It does not carry a pantry car coach and its rakes are shared with 12881/82 Puri Howrah Garib Rath Express

As is customary with most train services in India, coach composition may be amended at the discretion of Indian Railways depending on demand.

Loco	1	2	3	4	5	6	7	8	9	10	11	12	13	14	15	16	17	18
	EOG	G1	G2	G3	G4	G5	G6	G7	G8	G9	G10	G11	G12	G13	G14	G15	G16	EOG

== Service ==
The 22883 Puri Yesvantpur Junction Garib Rath Express covers the distance of 1,517 km (943 mi) in 29 hours (52.00 km/h) and in 31 hours as 22884 Yesvantpur Junction Puri Garib Rath Express (49.00 km/h).

As the average speed of the train is above 50.5 km/h (31 mph), as per Indian Railways rules, its fare includes a Superfast surcharge.

== Route ==
The 22883 / 84 Puri Yesvantpur Junction Garib Rath Express runs from

ODISHA

1. Puri
2. Khurda Road Junction
3. Chatrapur
4. Brahmapur

ANDHRA PRADESH

1. Sompeta
2. Palasa
3. Srikakulam Road
4. Vizianagaram Junction
5. Visakhapatnam Junction
6. Duvvada
7. Anakapalle
8. Samalkot Junction
9. Rajahmundry
10. Eluru
11. Vijayawada Junction
12. Guntur Junction
13. Narasaraopet
14. Donakonda
15. Markapur Road
16. Diguvametta
17. Nandyal
18. Dhone Junction
19. Anantapur
20. Dharmavaram Junction
21. Hindupur

KARNATAKA

1. Yelahanka Junction
2. Yesvantpur Junction

.

== Traction ==
As the route is fully electrified and a Visakhapatnam based WAP 7 pulls up to Visakhapatnam later that Lallaguda based WAP 7 locomotive powers the train up to its destination.

== Operation ==
22883 Puri Yesvantpur Junction Garib Rath Express leaves Puri every Friday & arriving Yesvantpur Junction the next day.

22884 Yesvantpur Junction Puri Garib Rath Express leaves Yesvantpur Junction every Saturday & arriving Puri the next day.
