= Baidyanathdham Express =

Overview
- Service type: Express
- Locale: Odisha, West Bengal, Jharkhand & Bihar
- Current operator: East Coast Railway zone

Route
- Termini: Puri (PURI); Patna Junction (PNBE)
- Stops: 24
- Distance travelled: 932 km (579 mi)
- Average journey time: 19h 35m
- Service frequency: Weekly (Note: Runs one day in a week for every direction.)
- Train number: 18449/18450

On-board services
- Classes: AC 2 tier, AC 3 tier, Sleeper class, General Unreserved
- Seating arrangements: No
- Sleeping arrangements: Yes
- Catering facilities: On-board catering E-catering
- Observation facilities: LHB coach
- Entertainment facilities: No
- Baggage facilities: No
- Other facilities: Below the seats

Technical
- Rolling stock: 2
- Track gauge: 1,676 mm (5 ft 6 in)
- Operating speed: 48 km/h (30 mph), including halts
Route map
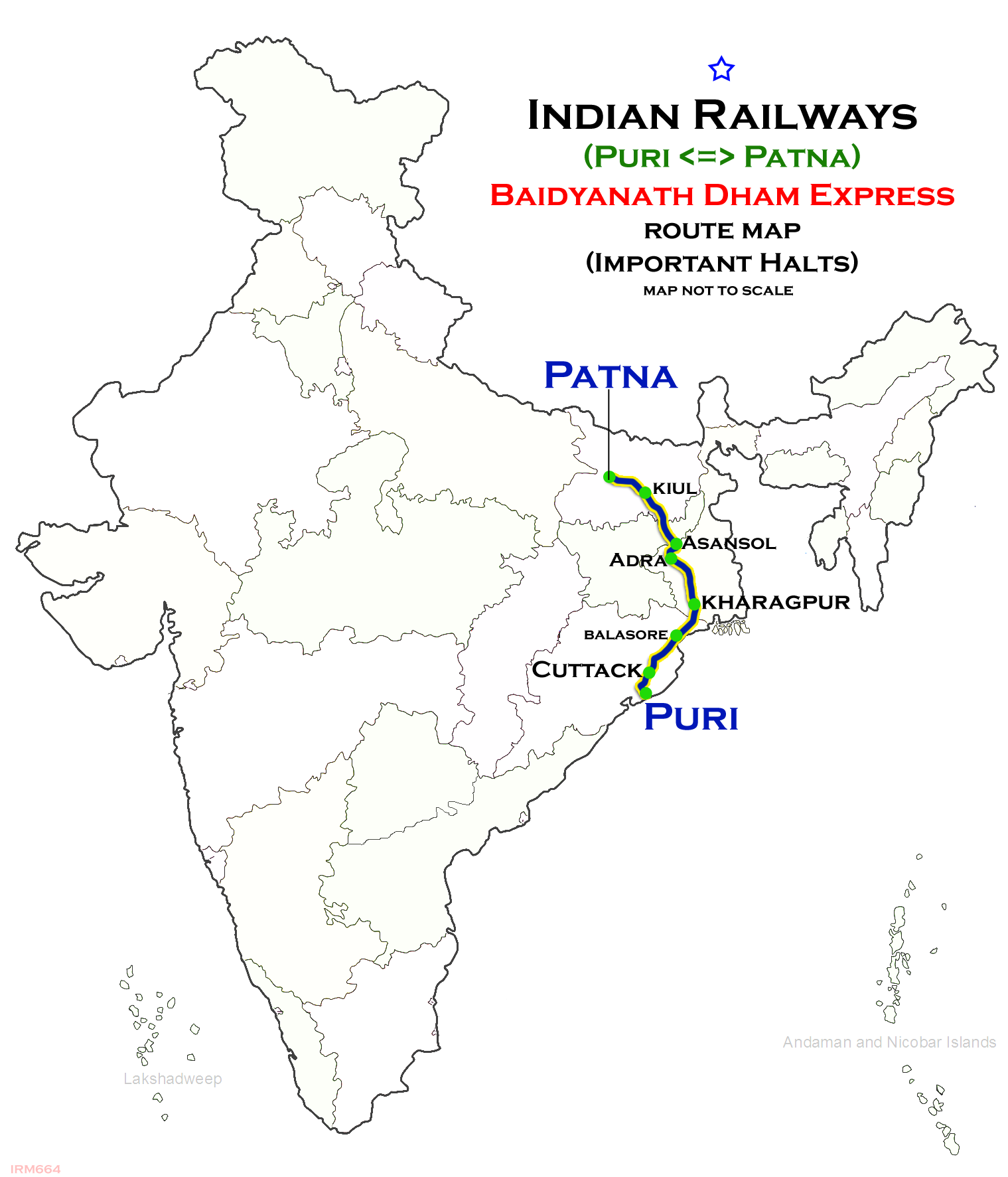

The Baidyanathdham Express is an Express train belonging to East Coast Railway zone that runs between Puri and Patna Junction in India. It is currently being operated with 18449/18450 train numbers on a weekly basis.

The train has given name in honour to the famous Baidyanath Temple of Deoghar. Other than Baidyanathdham Express, one Station in Deoghar has named Baidyanathdham Deoghar railway station and two other trains named in honour to the temple, These trains are 22465/66 Baba Baidyanath Dham Deoghar SF Express and 22459/60 Baba Baidyanath Dham Deoghar Humsafar Express.

== Background ==
This train is on the Ravana the demon king meditated hard, in order to invoke Lord Shiva. Shiva gave him one of the twelve Jyotirlingams to take back with him to Lanka, with the condition that if it were placed on the ground it would take root immediately. Varuna the God of water, entered Ravana's belly, and caused him to feel the need to relieve himself. Vishnu then came down in the form of a lad and volunteered to hold the Jyotirlingam as he relieved himself. But before Ravana could return, the young lad placed the Jyotirlingam on the ground to which it became rooted. A disappointed Ravana offered severe penances to Shiva here, and cut off nine of his heads as a part of his repentance. Shiva revived him and joined the heads to the body, like a Vaidya or a "physician", and hence, this Jyotirlingam goes by the name Vaidyanath.

== Service ==
The 18449/Puri Baidyanathdham Express has an average speed of 48 km/h and covers 932 km in 19h 35m. The 18450/Puri Baidyanathdham Express has an average speed of 51 km/h and covers 932 km in 18h 15m.

== Route and halts ==
The important halts of the train are:

- Puri
- Khurda Road Junction
- Bhubaneswar
- Cuttack Junction
- Hijli
- Bankura Junction
- Adra Junction
- Asansol Junction
- Madhupur Junction
- Jasidih Junction
- Jhajha
- Kiul Junction
- Barh
- Bakhtiyarpur Junction
- Patna Junction

== Coach composition ==
The train has standard LHB rakes with a maximum speed of 130 km/h. The train consists of 18 coaches:

- 1 AC II Tier
- 7 AC III Tier
- 6 Sleeper coaches
- 2 General Unreserved
- 1 Seating cum Luggage Coach
- 1 Generator coach

== Traction ==
Both train are hauled by a Samastipur Loco Shed or Gomoh Loco Shed based WAP-7 and WAG-9 electric locomotive from Patna till Asansol. From Asansol till Puri the train is hauled by a Visakhapatnam Loco Shed or Howrah Loco Shed based WAP-7 and WAG-9 electric locomotive.

== Rake sharing ==
The train shares its rake with 22889/22890 Samudra Kanya Express and 12895/12896 Shalimar-Puri Weekly SF Express.

| Train No. | Train name | Departs | Arrival |
|---|---|---|---|
| 18449 | Puri Baidyanath Dham Express | PURI@14:25 MON | PNBE@10:00 TUE |
| 18450 | Puri Baidyanath Dham Express | PNBE@8:40 WED | PURI@3:20 THU |
| 12896 | Puri–Howrah Weekly Superfast Express | PURI@22:10 THU | HWH@7:05 FRI |
| 12895 | Howrah–Puri Weekly Superfast Express | HWH@20:55 FRI | PURI@5:50 SAT |
| 22890 | Samudra Kanya Express | PURI@23:40 SAT | DGHA@9:25 SUN |
| 22889 | Samudra Kanya Express | DGHA@17:15 SUN | PURI@3:20 MON |

== Direction reversal ==
The train reverses its direction once:

- Asansol Junction

== See also ==
- Patna Junction railway station
- Puri railway station
- Samudra Kanya Express
- Howrah–Puri Express
