= Motari Halt railway station =

Railway station in Odisa

Motari Halt

General information
- Location: Motari Station Road, Garamotari, Puri district, Odisha; India
- Coordinates: 20°05′26″N 85°43′45″E
- Elevation: 12 m (39 ft)
- System: Indian Railways
- Owner: Indian Railways
- Line: Kharagpur–Puri line
- Platforms: 2
- Tracks: Broad gauge 5 ft 6 in (1,676 mm)

Construction
- Structure type: Standard (on-ground station)

Other information
- Status: Functioning
- Station code: MWQ
- Zone(s): East Coast Railway
- Division(s): Khurda Road

History
- Opened: 1897
- Former names: East Coast State Railway

Services
Preceding station	Indian Railways	Following station
Haripur Gram towards Kharagpur Junction	East Coast Railway zone Khurda Road–Puri section	Kanas Road towards Puri
Location
- Location within Odisha Location within India

Motari Halt railway station is a halt railway station on Kharagpur–Puri line in East Coast Railway zone under Khurda Road railway division of Indian Railways. The station is situated beside Motari Station Road at Garamotari in Puri district of the Indian state of Odisha.

== History ==
As the branch of Howrah–Chennai main line, the Khurda Road–Puri section was opened to traffic on 1 February 1897. The complete track became doubled in July 2015.
