= Shalimar–Puri Express =

Train in India

Shalimar-Puri Express
Overview
- Service type: Superfast Express
- First service: 5 July 2011; 14 years ago
- Current operator: South Eastern Railway

Route
- Termini: Shalimar (SHM); Puri (PURI)
- Stops: 9
- Distance travelled: 500 km (311 mi)
- Average journey time: 08 hours 55 mins
- Service frequency: Weekly
- Train number: 22835 / 22836

On-board services
- Classes: AC 2 tier, AC 3 tier, Sleeper class, Unreserved/General
- Seating arrangements: Yes
- Sleeping arrangements: Yes
- Catering facilities: On-board catering, E-catering
- Observation facilities: Large windows
- Other facilities: Below the seats

Technical
- Rolling stock: LHB coach
- Track gauge: 1,676 mm (5 ft 6 in)
- Operating speed: 130 km/h (81 mph) maximum, 55 km/h (34 mph) average including halts.
Route map
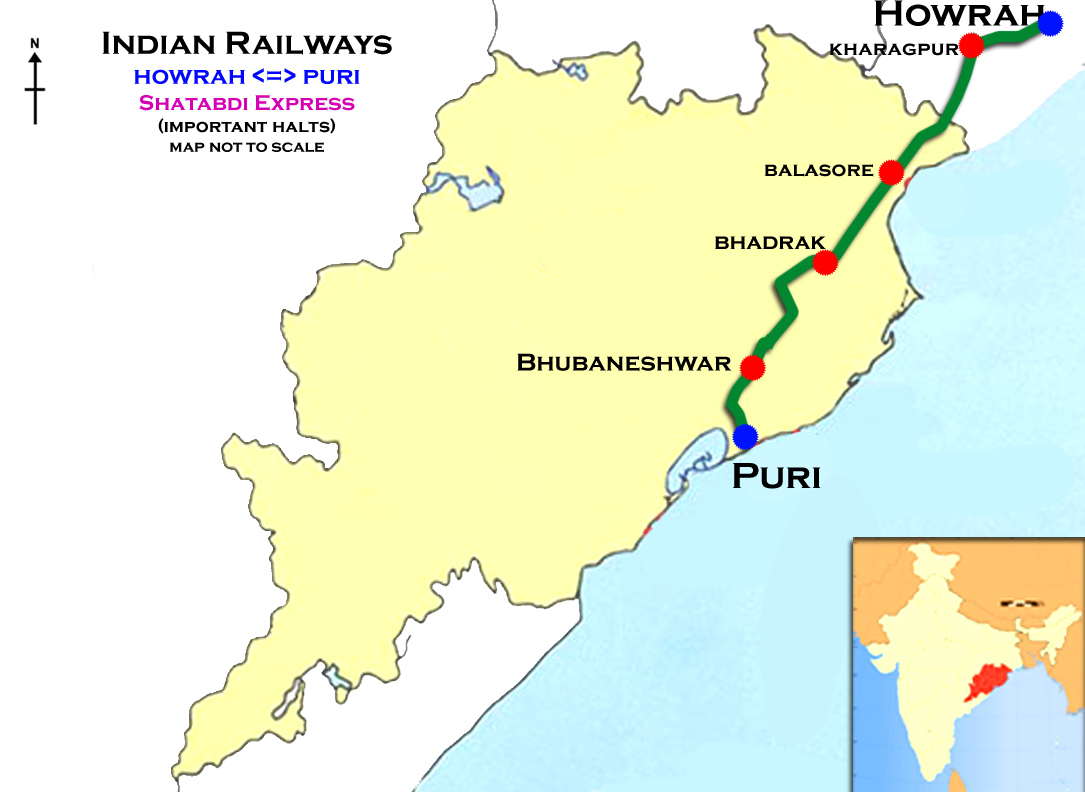

The 22835 / 22836 Shalimar–Puri Express is a Superfast Express train belonging to Indian Railways – South Eastern Railway zone that runs between Shalimar and Puri in India.

It operates as train number 22835 from Shalimar to Puri and as train number 22836 in the reverse direction, serving the states of West Bengal and Odisha.

== Coaches ==
The 22835 / 36 Shalimar–Puri Express has 1 AC 2 tier, 5 AC 3 tier, 8 Sleeper class, 5 Unreserved/General, 1 Pantry car and 2 Generator car EOG Coaches.

As is customary with most train services in India, coach composition may be amended at the discretion of Indian Railways depending on demand.

== Service ==
The 22835 Shalimar–Puri Express covers the distance of 500 km (311 mi) in 8 hours 55 mins (56.07 km/h) and in 09 hours 05 mins as 22836 Puri–Shalimar Express (55.05 km/h).

As the average speed of the train is above 55 km/h (34 mph), as per Indian Railways rules, its fare includes a Superfast surcharge.

== Routing ==
The 22835 / 36 Shalimar–Puri Express runs from Shalimar via Santragachi Junction, Kharagpur Junction, Balasore, Cuttack, Bhubaneswar to Puri.

== Traction ==
As the route is fully electrified, a Santragachi-based WAP-4 powers the train for its entire journey.

== Operation ==
22836 Puri–Shalimar Express runs from Puri every Tuesday reaching Shalimar the next day.

22835 Shalimar–Puri Express runs from Shalimar every Wednesday reaching Puri the next day.
