= Bilaspur–Tirupati Express =

Train in India

Overview
- Service type: Express
- First service: 3 July 2005; 21 years ago
- Current operator: South Coast Railways

Route
- Termini: Bilaspur (BSP); Tirupati (TPTY)
- Stops: 63
- Distance travelled: 1,404 km (872 mi)
- Average journey time: 30h 30m
- Service frequency: Bi-weekly
- Train number: 17481 / 17482

On-board services
- Classes: AC 2 tier, AC 3 tier, Sleeper Class, General Unreserved
- Seating arrangements: No
- Sleeping arrangements: Yes
- Catering facilities: On-board catering E-catering
- Observation facilities: Rake sharing with 17479/17480 Puri–Tirupati Express
- Baggage facilities: No
- Other facilities: Below the seats

Technical
- Rolling stock: LHB coach
- Track gauge: 1,676 mm (5 ft 6 in)
- Operating speed: 46 km/h (29 mph) average including halts
Route map
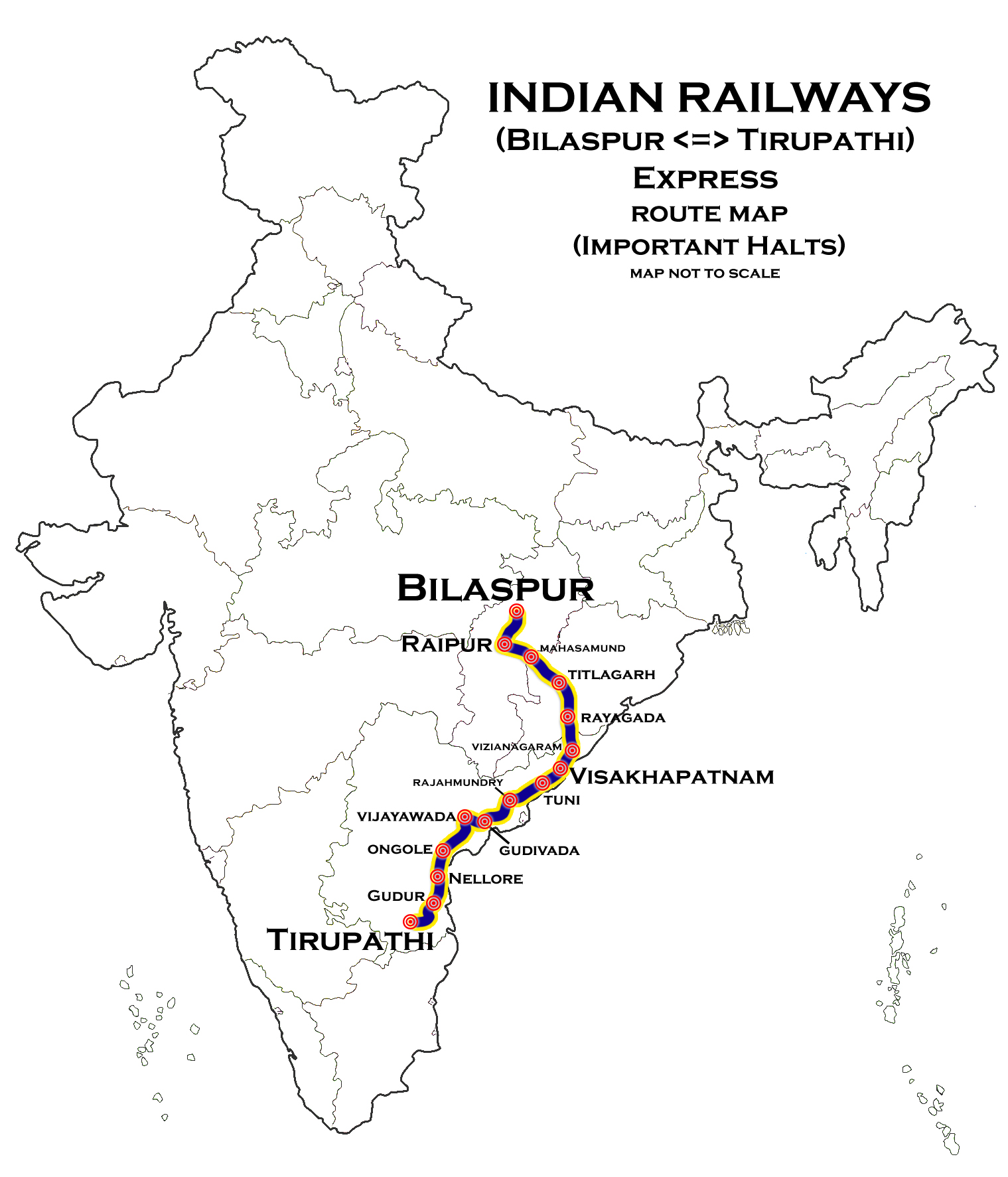

The 17481 / 17482 Bilaspur–Tirupati Express is an Express train belonging to South Coast Railway zone that runs between Bilaspur Junction and Tirupati in India. It is currently being operated with 17481/17482 train numbers on bi-weekly basis.

== Service ==
The 17481/Bilaspur–Tirupati Express has an average speed of 46 km/h and covers 1404 km in 30h 30m. The 17482/Tirupati–Bilaspur Express has an average speed of 45 km/h and covers 1404 km in 31h 10m.

== Train schedule ==
From Bilaspur Jn to Tirupati - 17481. The train starts from Bilaspur Jn on Tuesday and Saturday.

Station code	Station name	Arrival	Departure
BSP	Bilaspur Junction	---	15:35
BYT	Bhatapara	16:13	16:15
TLD	Tilda-Neora	16:36	16:38
R	Raipur Junction	17:15	17:35
MSMD	Mahasamund	18:28	18:30
BGBR	Bagbahra	18:58	19:00
KRAR	Khariar Road	19:18	19:20
NPD	Nawapara Road	19:33	19:35
HSK	Harishanker Road	19:55	19:57
KBJ	Kantabanji	20:20	20:25
TIG	Titlagarh Junction	21:05	21:15
KSNG	Kesinga	21:40	21:42
MNGD	Muniguda	22:48	22:50
RGDA	Rayagada	23:55	00:05
PVPT	Parvatipuram Town	00:43	00:45
PVP	Parvatipuram	00:48	00:50
VBL	Bobbili Junction	01:15	01:20
VZM	Vizianagaram Junction	02:10	02:20
KTV	Kottavalasa	02:48	02:50
SCM	Simhachalam	03:08	03:10
VSKP	Visakhapatnam Junction	03:25	03:45
DVD	Duvvada	04:13	04:15
AKP	Anakapalle	04:28	04:30
YLM	Ellamanchili	04:48	04:50
TUNI	Tuni	05:18	05:20
ANV	Annavaram	05:33	05:35
PAP	Pithapuram	06:03	06:05
SLO	Samalkot Junction	06:23	06:25
APT	Anaparti	06:48	06:50
DWP	Dwarapudi	06:53	06:55
RJY	Rajahmundry	07:18	07:20
KVR	Kovvur	07:33	07:35
NDD	Nidadavolu Junction	07:48	07:50
TNKU	Tanuku	08:13	08:15
BVRT	Bhimavaram Town	08:58	09:00
AKVD	Akividu	09:18	09:20
KKLR	Kaikaluru	09:38	09:40
GDV	Gudivada Junction	10:18	10:20
BZA	Vijayawada Junction	11:20	11:30
TEL	Tenali Junction	11:58	12:00
NDO	Nidubrolu	12:18	12:20
BPP	Bapatla	12:38	12:40
CLX	Chirala	12:53	12:55
VTM	Vetapalem	13:03	13:05
CJM	Chinna Ganjam	13:13	13:15
ANB	Ammanabrolu	13:28	13:30
OGL	Ongole	14:08	14:10
TNR	Tanguturu	14:23	14:25
SKM	Singarayakonda	14:38	14:40
KVZ	Kavali	15:08	15:10
BTTR	Bitragunta	15:28	15:30
NLR	Nellore	16:03	16:05
GDR	Gudur Junction	17:28	17:30
VKI	Venkatagiri	17:48	17:50
KHT	Sri Kalahasti	18:08	18:10
RU	Renigunta Junction	18:38	18:40
TPTY	Tirupati	20:05	---

From Tirupati to Bilaspur Jn - 17482. The train starts from Tirupati on Wednesday and Sunday.

Station code	Station name	Arrival	Departure
TPTY	Tirupati	---	11:05
RU	Renigunta Junction	11:25	11:30
KHT	Sri Kalahasti	11:48	11:50
VKI	Venkatagiri	12:08	12:10
GDR	Gudur Junction	13:00	13:05
NLR	Nellore	13:33	13:35
BTTR	Bitragunta	14:03	14:05
KVZ	Kavali	14:23	14:25
SKM	Singarayakonda	14:48	14:50
TNR	Tanguturu	15:03	15:05
OGL	Ongole	15:38	15:40
ANB	Ammanabrolu	16:03	16:05
CJM	Chinna Ganjam	16:18	16:20
VTM	Vetapalem	16:28	16:30
CLX	Chirala	16:43	16:45
BPP	Bapatla	16:58	17:00
NDO	Nidubrolu	17:18	17:20
TEL	Tenali Junction	17:48	17:50
BZA	Vijayawada Junction	18:30	18:40
GDV	Gudivada Junction	19:33	19:35
KKLR	Kaikaluru	20:03	20:05
AKVD	Akividu	20:23	20:25
BVRT	Bhimavaram Town	20:48	20:50
TNKU	Tanuku	21:18	21:20
NDD	Nidadavolu Junction	21:48	21:50
KVR	Kovvur	22:03	22:05
RJY	Rajahmundry	22:28	22:30
DWP	Dwarapudi	22:53	22:55
APT	Anaparti	22:58	23:00
SLO	Samalkot Junction	23:23	23:25
PAP	Pithapuram	23:43	23:45
ANV	Annavaram	00:08	00:10
TUNI	Tuni	00:23	00:25
YLM	Ellamanchili	00:53	00:55
AKP	Anakapalle	01:13	01:15
DVD	Duvvada	01:33	01:35
VSKP	Visakhapatnam Junction	02:20	02:40
SCM	Simhachalam	02:53	02:55
KTV	Kottavalasa	03:13	03:15
VZM	Vizianagaram Junction	03:50	04:00
VBL	Bobbili Junction	04:48	04:50
PVP	Parvatipuram	05:13	05:15
PVPT	Parvatipuram Town	05:18	05:20
RGDA	Rayagada	06:20	06:30
MNGD	Muniguda	07:33	07:35
KSNG	Kesinga	08:38	08:40
TIG	Titlagarh Junction	09:05	09:15
KBJ	Kantabanji	09:45	09:50
HSK	Harishanker Road	10:13	10:15
NPD	Nawapara Road	10:33	10:35
KRAR	Khariar Road	10:48	10:50
BGBR	Bagbahra	11:18	11:20
MSMD	Mahasamund	11:48	11:50
R	Raipur Junction	13:00	13:20
TLD	Tilda-Neora	13:53	13:55
BYT	Bhatapara	14:18	14:20
BSP	Bilaspur Junction	17:25	---

== Coach composition ==
The train has standard LHB rakes with max speed of 130 kmph. The train consists of 20 coaches :

- 1 AC II Tier
- 5 AC III Tier
- 6 Sleeper Coaches
- 3 General Coaches
- 2 Seating cum Luggage Rake

== Traction ==
Both trains are hauled by a Visakhapatnam-based WAP-4 / WAP-7 locomotive from Bilaspur to Visakhapatnam. From Visakhapatnam to Vijayawada it is hauled by WDM-3D / WDM-3A of Guntakal / Visakhapatnam shed and from Vijayawada to Tirupati both trains are hauled by a Vijayawada-based WAP-4 / WAG-5P electric locomotive and vice versa.

== Direction reversal ==
The train reverses its direction 2 times:

- Raipur Junction
- Visakhapatnam Junction

== Rake sharing ==
The train shares its rake with 17479/17480 Puri–Tirupati Express.

== See also ==
- Bilaspur Junction railway station
- Tirupati railway station
- Puri–Tirupati Express
