= Delang railway station =

Railway station on the East Coast Railway network in India

Delang

General information
- Location: Delang, Odisha; India
- Coordinates: 20°02′16″N 85°46′03″E
- System: Indian Railways station
- Owner: Ministry of Railways, Indian Railways
- Lines: Kharagpur-Puri line, Khurda Road–Puri line
- Platforms: 3
- Tracks: 4

Construction
- Structure type: Standard (on ground)
- Parking: yes

Other information
- Status: Functioning
- Station code: DEG
- Zone(s): East Coast Railway
- Division(s): Khurda Road
Location
- Location within India Location within Odisha

Delang railway station is a railway station on the East Coast Railway network in the state of Odisha, India. It serves Delang town. Its code is DEG. It has three platforms. Passenger, MEMU, Express trains halt at Delang railway station.

== Major trains ==
- Puri–Barbil Express
- Howrah–Puri Express
- Paradeep−Puri Intercity Express

== See also ==
- Puri district
