= Paradeep–Visakhapatnam Express =

Train in India

Overview
- Service type: Superfast Express
- First service: 11 February 2015; 11 years ago
- Current operator: South Coast Railway

Route
- Termini: Paradeep (PRDP); Visakhapatnam (VSKP)
- Stops: 13
- Distance travelled: 554 km (344 mi)
- Average journey time: 9 hours 45 mins
- Service frequency: Weekly
- Train number: 22809 / 22810

On-board services
- Classes: General Unreserved, AC 2 Tier, AC 3 Tier, Sleeper Class
- Seating arrangements: Yes
- Sleeping arrangements: Yes
- Catering facilities: E-catering
- Observation facilities: 22801/22802 Visakhapatnam–Chennai Central Express
- Baggage facilities: No
- Other facilities: Below the seats

Technical
- Rolling stock: LHB coach
- Track gauge: 1,676 mm (5 ft 6 in)
- Operating speed: 57 km/h (35 mph) average including halts.
Route map
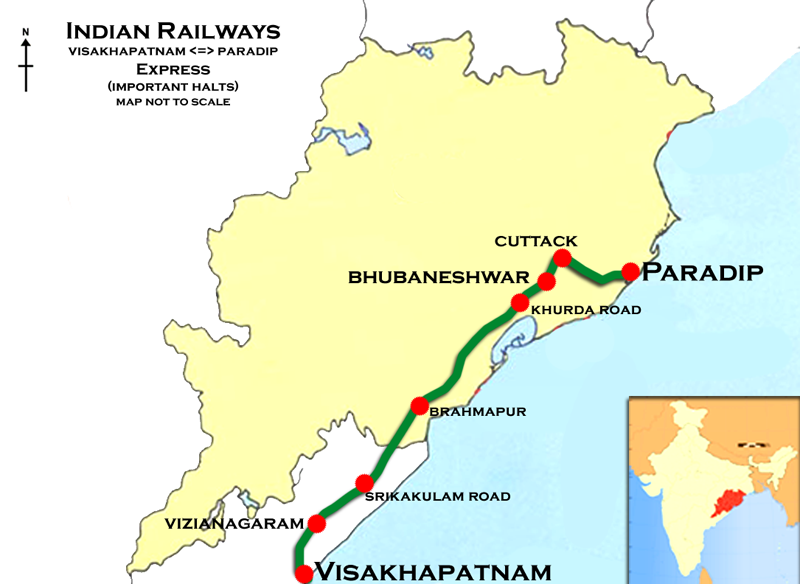

The 22809 / 22810 Paradeep–Visakhapatnam Express is an superfast express train belonging to South Coast Railway zone that runs between Paradeep and Visakhapatnam in India.

It operates as train number 22809 from Paradeep to Visakhapatnam and as train number 22810 in the reverse direction, serving the states of Odisha and Andhra Pradesh.

== Coaches ==
The 22809 / 10 Paradeep–Visakhapatnam Express has one AC 2 tier, three AC 3 tier, seven sleeper coaches, six general unreserved and two SLR (seating with luggage rake) coaches . It does not carry a pantry car.

As is customary with most train services in India, coach composition may be amended at the discretion of Indian Railways depending on demand.

== Service ==
The 22809 Paradeep–Visakhapatnam Express covers the distance of 554 km (344 mi) in 9 hours 20 mins (59 km/h) and in 9 hours 15 mins as the 22810 Visakhapatnam–Paradeep Express (60 km/h).

As the average speed of the train is higher than 55 km/h (34 mph), as per railway rules, its fare includes a Superfast surcharge.

== Schedule ==
22809 – Starts from Paradeep every Wednesday at 22:55 IST and reaches Vishakapatnama next day morning 08:20 AM

22810 – Starts from Vishakapatnama every Sundayat 23:50 IST and reaches Paradeep next day morning 09:10 AM IST

== Routing ==
The 22809 / 10 Paradeep–Visakhapatnam Express runs from Paradeep via Cuttack Junction, Khurda Road Junction, Vizianagaram Junction to Visakhapatnam.

== Traction ==
As the route is electrified, a Visakhapatnam Loco Shed-based WAP-7 electric locomotive pulls the train to its destination.

== Reverse ==
The train reverses at Cuttack Junction.

== Rake composition ==
- 1 AC II Tier
- 3 AC III Tier
- 7 Sleeper coaches
- 6 General
- 2 Second-class Luggage/parcel van

Loco	1	2	3	4	5	6	7	8	9	10	11	12	13	14	15	16	17	18	19
	EoG	GEN	GEN	GEN	GEN	S1	S2	S3	S4	S5	S6	S7	B1	B2	B3	A1	GEN	GEN	SLR
