= Korai railway station =

Railway station on the East Coast Railway network in India

Korai

General information
- Location: Korai, Odisha; India
- Coordinates: 20°57′38″N 86°10′45″E
- System: Indian Railways station
- Owner: Ministry of Railways, Indian Railways
- Line: Howrah–Chennai main line
- Platforms: 2
- Tracks: 2

Construction
- Structure type: Standard (on ground)
- Parking: No

Other information
- Status: Functioning
- Station code: KRIH
- Zone(s): East Coast Railway
- Division(s): Khurda Road
Location
- Location within India Location within Odisha

Korai railway station is a railway station on the East Coast Railway network in the state of Odisha, India. It serves Korai town. Its code is KRIH. It has two platforms. Passenger, MEMU, Express trains halt at Korai railway station.

== Major trains ==
- East Coast Express

== Train Accident ==
A freight train derailed in Odisha, India, on November 22, 2022; three people were killed and two were injured.

== See also ==
- Jajpur district
