= Malatipatapur =

Malatipatapur Malatipatapur
- village
- Location in Odisha, India Malatipatapur (India)
- Coordinates: 19°51′55″N 85°49′55″E
- Country: India
- State: Odisha
- District: ପୁରୀ

Government
  - Type: Democratic

Languages
  - Official: Oriya
- Time zone: UTC+5:30 (IST)
- PIN: 752002
- Vehicle registration: OD
- Website: odisha.gov.in

Malatipatapur is a village in Sadar Tehsil in Puri District of India's Odisha state. It is a small village located 6 km towards North from District headquarters Puri and 53 km from State capital Bhubaneswar. Odia is the local language here. Colleges near Malatipatpur are Nayahat Mahavidyalaya, Mangal Moha Bidyalaya, kaktpur Mangala Mahavidyalaya, Pipilicollege, pipili, puri Address : At-college Chak Near By Hatta Chak Schools near Malatipatpur are Panchayat High School, Padmapur English Medium School, K.p.high School, Padmapur, Silad High School

== Geography ==
Puri, Jatani, Khordha, Bhubaneswar are the nearby Cities to Malatipatpur. It is near to bay of Bengal. There is a chance of humidity in the weather.

== Demography ==
Malatipatpur is surrounded by Puri Tahasil towards South, Satyabadi Tahasil towards North, Brahmagiri Tahasil towards west, Delanga Tahasil towards North .

== Transportation ==
Malatipatpur railway station, Jankidaipur Rail Way Station are the very nearby railway stations to Malatipatpur. However Puri Rail Way Station is amajor railway station 8 km from Malatipatpur
