= Puri–Shalimar Garib Rath Express =

Puri Shalimar Garib Rath Express
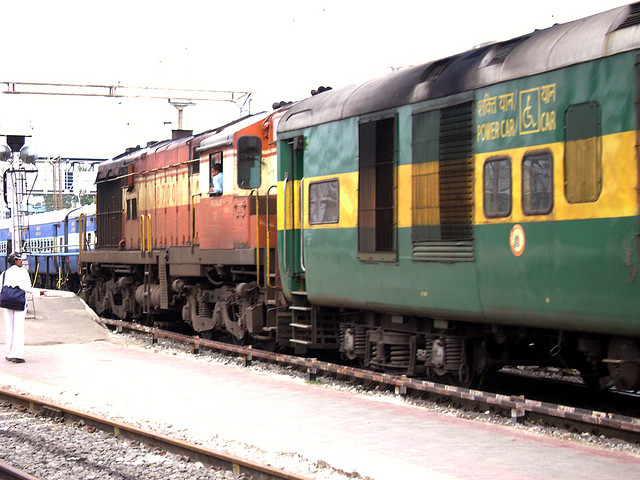

Overview
- Service type: Superfast Express, Garib Rath Express
- First service: 5 January 2009
- Current operator: East Central Railways

Route
- Termini: Puri; Shalimar railway station
- Stops: 7
- Distance travelled: 497 km (309 mi)
- Average journey time: 8 hours 50 minutes as 12882 Puri Shalimar Garib Rath Express, 9 hours 00 minutes as 12881 Puri Garib Rath Express.
- Service frequency: 2 days a week. 12882 Puri Shalimar Garib Rath Express – Monday & Wednesday. 12881 Shalimar Puri Garib Rath Express – Tuesday & Thursday.
- Train number: 12882 / 12881

On-board services
- Class: AC 3 tier
- Seating arrangements: No
- Sleeping arrangements: Yes
- Auto-rack arrangements: No
- Catering facilities: No
- Observation facilities: Rake Sharing with 22883/84 Puri−Yesvantpur Garib Rath Express
- Baggage facilities: Storage space under berth

Technical
- Rolling stock: LHB Garib Rath Coaches
- Track gauge: 1,676 mm (5 ft 6 in)
- Electrification: Yes
- Operating speed: 110 km/h (68 mph) maximum,56.30 km/h (35 mph), including halts

The Puri-Shalimar Garib Rath Express is a Superfast Express train of the Garib Rath series belonging to Indian Railways - East Coast Railway zone that runs between Puri and Shalimar in India.

It operates as train number 12882 from Puri to Shalimar and as train number 12881 in the reverse direction serving the states of West Bengal & Odisha. Previously the train was used to run between Howrah Junction and Puri, but later moved to Shalimar.

== Coaches ==
The 12882 / 81 Puri Shalimar Garib Rath Express has 16 AC 3 tier & 2 End on Generator Coaches. It does not carry a Pantry car coach .

As is customary with most train services in India, Coach Composition may be amended at the discretion of Indian Railways depending on demand.

== Service ==
The 12882 Puri Shalimar Garib Rath Express covers the distance of 497 km (309 mi) in 8 hours 50 mins (56.83 km/h) and in 9 hours 00 mins as 12881 Shalimar Puri Garib Rath Express (55.78 km/h).

As the average speed of the train is above 55 km/h (34 mph), as per Indian Railways rules, its fare includes a superfast surcharge.

== Routeing ==
The 12882 / 81 Puri Shalimar Garib Rath Express runs from Puri via Bhubaneswar, Cuttack, Bhadrak, Kharagpur Junction to Shalimar.

== Traction ==
As the route is fully electrified, a Visakhapatnam based WAP-4 or WAP-7 powers the train for its entire journey .

== Operation ==
12882 Puri Shalimar Garib Rath Express leaves Puri every Monday & Wednesday arriving Shalimar the next day.

12881 Shalimar Puri Garib Rath Express leaves Shalimar every Tuesday & Thursday arriving Puri the next day.
