= Puri–Tirupati Express =

Train in India

Overview
- Service type: Express
- First service: 1 January 1992; 34 years ago
- Current operator: South Coast Railways

Route
- Termini: Puri (PURI); Tirupati (TPTY)
- Stops: 71
- Distance travelled: 1,233 km (766 mi)
- Average journey time: 28h 5m
- Service frequency: 5 days a week
- Train number: 17479 / 17480

On-board services
- Classes: AC 2 tier, AC 3 tier, Sleeper class, General Unreserved
- Seating arrangements: No
- Sleeping arrangements: Yes
- Catering facilities: On-board catering E-catering
- Observation facilities: Rake sharing with 17481/17482 Bilaspur–Tirupati Express
- Baggage facilities: No
- Other facilities: Below the seats

Technical
- Rolling stock: LHB coach
- Track gauge: 1,676 mm (5 ft 6 in)
- Operating speed: 44 km/h (27 mph) average including halts
Route map
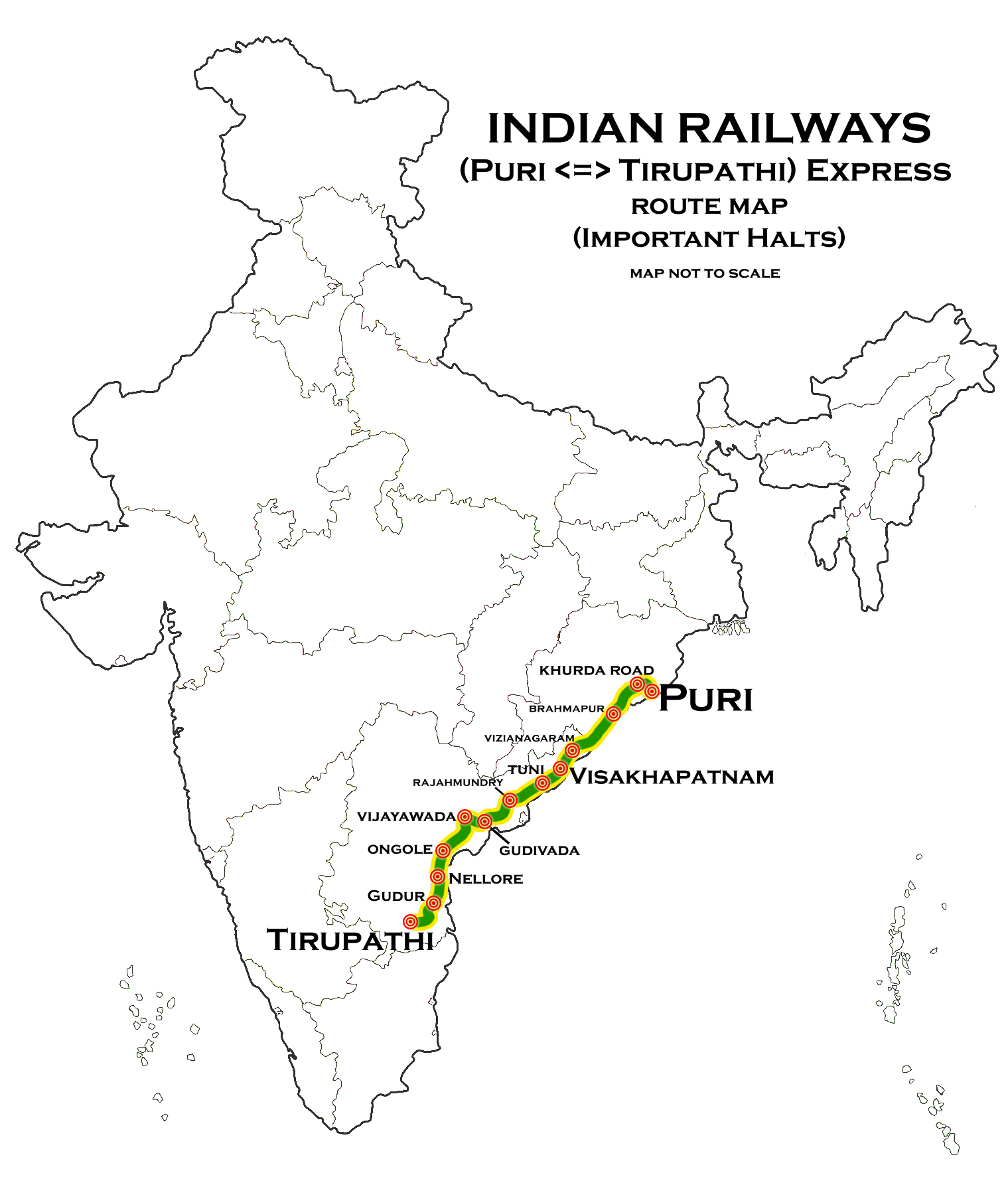

The 17479 / 17480 Puri–Tirupati Express is an Express train belonging to South Coast Railway zone that runs between Puri and Tirupati in India. It is currently being operated with 17479/17480 train numbers on weekly basis.

== Service ==
The 17479/Puri–Tirupati Express has an average speed of 44 km/h and covers 1233 km in 28h 5m. The 17480/Tirupati–Puri Express has an average speed of 44 km/h and covers 1233 km in 28h 5m.

== Train schedule ==
From Puri to Tirupati - 17479. The train starts from Puri 5 days a week.

Station code	Station name	Arrival	Departure
PURI	Puri	---	18:30
KUR	Khurda Road Junction	19:20	19:40
NKP	Nirakarpur	19:58	20:00
KAPG	Kalupara Ghat	20:13	20:15
BALU	Balugaon	20:36	20:38
KIT	Khallikot	20:51	21:02
CAP	Chatrapur	21:26	21:28
BAM	Brahmapur	21:43	21:48
IPM	Ichchapuram	22:26	22:28
SPT	Sompeta	22:42	22:44
MMS	Mandasa Road	22:56	22:58
PSA	Palasa	23:15	23:20
NWP	Naupada Junction	23:40	23:42
KBM	Kotabommali	23:53	23:55
TIU	Tilaru	00:06	00:08
CHE	Srikakulam Road	00:27	00:32
PDU	Ponduru	00:45	00:47
SGDM	Sigadam	00:56	00:58
CPP	Chipurupalle	01:10	01:12
VZM	Vizianagaram Junction	01:45	01:50
KTV	Kottavalasa Junction	02:24	02:26
SCM	Simhachalam	02:43	02:45
VSKP	Visakhapatnam	03:10	03:30
DVD	Duvvada	04:00	04:02
AKP	Anakapalle	04:18	04:20
YLM	Elamanchili	04:33	04:35
TUNI	Tuni	05:03	05:05
ANV	Annavaram	05:28	05:30
PAP	Pithapuram	05:54	05:55
SLO	Samalkot Junction	06:03	06:05
APT	Anaparti	06:43	06:45
DWP	Dwarapudi	06:53	06:55
RJY	Rajahmundry	07:18	07:20
KVR	Kovvur	07:43	07:45
NDD	Nidadavolu Junction	08:03	08:05
TNKU	Tanuku	08:38	08:40
BVRT	Bhimavaram Town	09:16	09:18
AKVD	Akividu	09:33	09:35
KKLR	Kaikaluru	09:48	09:50
GDV	Gudivada Junction	10:48	10:50
BZA	Vijayawada Junction	11:55	12:05
TEL	Tenali Junction	12:33	12:35
NDO	Nidubrolu	12:58	13:00
BPP	Bapatla	13:18	13:20
CLX	Chirala	13:33	13:35
VTM	Vetapalem	13:43	13:45
CJM	Chinna Ganjam	14:04	14:05
ANB	Ammanabrolu	14:18	14:20
OGL	Ongole	14:43	14:45
TNR	Tanguturu	14:58	15:00
SKM	Singarayakonda	15:08	15:10
KVZ	Kavali	15:48	15:50
BTTR	Bitragunta	16:03	16:05
NLR	Nellore	16:43	16:45
GDR	Gudur Junction	17:23	17:25
VKI	Venkatagiri	17:59	18:00
KHT	Sri Kalahasti	18:18	18:20
RU	Renigunta Junction	18:53	18:55
TPTY	Tirupati	20:05	---

From Tirupati to Puri - 17480. The train starts from Tirupati 5 days a week.

Station code	Station name	Arrival	Departure
TPTY	Tirupati	---	11:05
RU	Renigunta Junction	11:30	11:32
KHT	Sri Kalahasti	11:57	11:58
VKI	Venkatagiri	12:14	12:15
GDR	Gudur Junction	12:48	12:50
NLR	Nellore	13:23	13:25
BTTR	Bitragunta	13:53	13:55
KVZ	Kavali	14:08	14:10
SKM	Singarayakonda	14:39	14:40
TNR	Tanguturu	14:43	14:45
OGL	Ongole	15:14	15:15
ANB	Ammanabrolu	15:28	15:30
CJM	Chinna Ganjam	15:44	15:45
VTM	Vetapalem	15:57	15:58
CLX	Chirala	16:14	16:15
BPP	Bapatla	16:29	16:30
NDO	Nidubrolu	16:49	16:50
TEL	Tenali Junction	17:18	17:20
BZA	Vijayawada Junction	18:10	18:20
GDV	Gudivada Junction	19:08	19:10
KKLR	Kaikaluru	19:38	19:40
AKVD	Akividu	19:58	20:00
BVRT	Bhimavaram Town	20:18	20:20
TNKU	Tanuku	20:54	20:55
NDD	Nidadavolu Junction	21:58	22:00
KVR	Kovvur	22:13	22:15
RJY	Rajahmundry	22:23	22:25
DWP	Dwarapudi	22:43	22:45
APT	Anaparti	22:54	22:55
SLO	Samalkot Junction	23:18	23:20
PAP	Pithapuram	23:29	23:30
ANV	Annavaram	23:43	23:45
TUNI	Tuni	00:03	00:05
YLM	Elamanchili	00:43	00:45
AKP	Anakapalle	02:58	03:00
DVD	Duvvada	04:15	04:17
VSKP	Visakhapatnam	04:45	05:05
SCM	Simhachalam	05:23	05:25
KTV	Kottavalasa	05:38	05:40
VZM	Vizianagaram Junction	06:10	06:15
CPP	Chipurupalle	06:43	06:45
SGDM	Sigadam	06:53	06:55
PDU	Ponduru	07:03	07:05
CHE	Srikakulam Road	07:20	07:25
TIU	Tilaru	07:38	07:40
KBM	Kotabommali	07:53	07:55
NWP	Naupada Junction	08:03	08:05
PSA	Palasa	09:10	09:15
MMS	Mandasa Road	09:19	09:20
SPT	Sompeta	09:23	09:25
IPM	Ichchapuram	09:38	09:40
BAM	Brahmapur	10:00	10:05
CAP	Chatrapur	10:25	10:27
KIT	Khallikot	10:57	10:59
BALU	Balugaon	11:11	11:13
KAPG	Kalupara Ghat	11:34	11:36
NKP	Nirakarpur	11:49	11:51
KUR	Khurda Road Junction	12:45	13:05
PURI	Puri	14:50	---

== Coach composition ==
The train has standard LHB rakes with max speed of 130 kmph. The train consists of 20 coaches:

- 1 AC II Tier
- 5 AC III Tier
- 6 Sleeper coaches
- 4 General Coaches
- 2 Seating cum Luggage Rake

== Traction ==
Both trains are hauled by a Visakhapatnam based WAP-4 / WAP-7 locomotive from Puri to Tirupati and vice versa.

== Direction reversal ==
The train reverses its direction 2 times:

- Khurda Road Junction
- Visakhapatnam Junction

== Rake sharing ==
The train shares its rake with 17481/17482 Bilaspur–Tirupati Express.

== See also ==
- Puri railway station
- Tirupati railway station
- Bilaspur–Tirupati Express
