= Howrah–Puri Express =

Train in India

Howrah–Puri Superfast Express
Overview
- Service type: Superfast
- Locale: West Bengal & Odisha
- Current operator: South Eastern Railway

Route
- Termini: Howrah (HWH); Puri (PURI)
- Stops: 9
- Distance travelled: 501 km (311 mi)
- Average journey time: 8 hours 30 minutes
- Service frequency: Daily
- Train number: 12837 / 12838

On-board services
- Classes: AC First Class, AC 2 tier, AC 3 tier, Sleeper class, General Unreserved
- Seating arrangements: Yes
- Sleeping arrangements: Yes
- Catering facilities: On-board catering, E-catering
- Observation facilities: Large windows
- Baggage facilities: No
- Other facilities: Below the seats

Technical
- Rolling stock: LHB coach
- Track gauge: 1,676 mm (5 ft 6 in)
- Operating speed: 130 km/h (81 mph) maximum, 58 km/h (36 mph) average including halts.
Route map
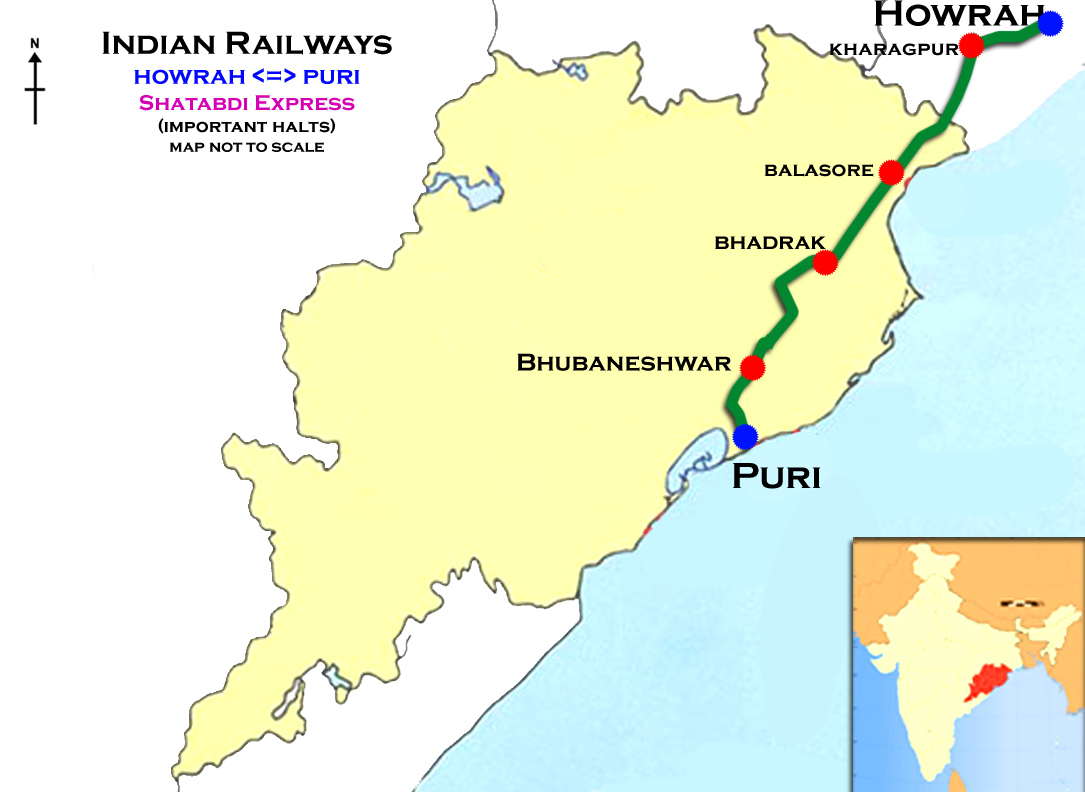

The 12837 / 12838 Howrah–Puri Superfast Express is a Superfast Express train belonging to Indian Railways – South Eastern Railway zone that runs between Howrah Junction and Puri in India.

It operates as train number 12837 from Howrah Junction to Puri and as train number 12838 in the reverse direction, serving the states of West Bengal and Odisha.

== Coaches ==
The 12837 / 38 Howrah–Puri Express has 1 AC First, 2 AC 2 tier, 5 AC 3 tier, 2 AC 3 tier economy, 8 Sleeper class, 2 General Unreserved, 1 EOG coach and 1 SLR coach. It does not carry a pantry car .

As is customary with most train services in India, coach composition may be amended at the discretion of Indian Railways depending on demand. The train got LHB rake on 30 April 2019.

== Service ==
The 12837 / 38 Howrah–Puri Express covers the distance of 502 km (312 mi) in 8 hours 30 mins (58.83 km/h) in both directions .

As the average speed of the train is above 55 km/h (34 mph), as per Indian Railways rules, its fare includes a Superfast surcharge.

The maximum speed of this train is currently set at 130 km/h (81 mph) between Howrah and Kharagpur stretch of South Eastern Railways.

== Route ==
The 12837 / 38 Howrah–Puri Express runs from Howrah Junction via Kharagpur Junction, Balasore, Cuttack, Bhubaneswar to Puri .

== Traction ==
As the route is fully electrified, a Santragachi Loco Shed or Tatanagar Loco Shed-based WAP-7 electric locomotive powers the train for its entire journey.

== Operation ==
12837 Howrah–Puri Express runs from Howrah Junction on a daily basis reaching Puri the next day .

12838 Puri–Howrah Express runs from Puri on a daily basis reaching Howrah Junction the next day.
