= Paradeep railway station =

Railway station in Odisha, India

Paradeep
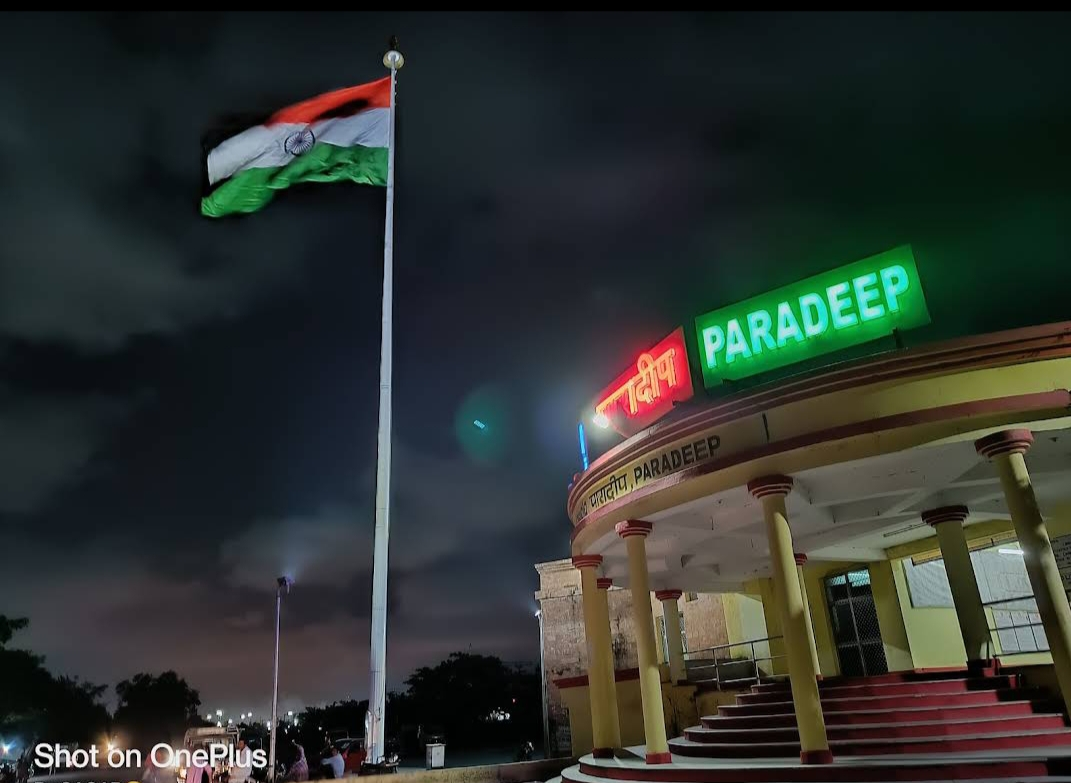
- Paradeep railway station

General information
- Location: Paradip, Odisha; India
- Coordinates: 20.2796°N 86.6122°E
- Elevation: 2 metres (6.6 ft)
- System: Indian Railways station
- Owner: Indian Railways
- Operator: East Coast Railway
- Line: Cuttack-Paradip line
- Platforms: 3
- Tracks: 4 (Double Electrified BG)
- Connections: Auto stand

Construction
- Structure type: Standard (on ground station)
- Parking: Yes
- Cycle facilities: Yes

Other information
- Status: Functioning
- Station code: PRDP
- Zone(s): East Coast Railway
- Division(s): Khurda Road

History
- Former names: Rangiagada railway station
Location
- Location within Odisha Location within India

Paradeep railway station is a major railway station in Jagatsinghpur district, Odisha. Its code is PRDP. It serves Paradeep city. It is the biggest railway station in Jagatsinghpur district. The station consists of three platforms. It is one of the most important Railway station of Eastern coast of India.

== Major trains ==
Some of the important trains that run from Paradeep are:

Originating trains :-

58402 Paradeep - Cuttack passenger

58406 Paradeep - Cuttack fast passenger

68436 Paradeep - Cuttack MEMU

18413 Paradeep - Puri intercity express

22809 Paradeep - Visakhapatnam weekly SF express

22814 Paradeep - Santragachi weekly SF express

Terminating train :-

58401 Cuttack - Paradeep passenger

58405 Cuttack - Paradeep fast passenger

68435 Cuttack - Paradeep MEMU

18414 Puri - Paradeep intercity express

22810 Visakhapatnam - Paradeep weekly SF express

22813 Santragachi - Paradeep weekly SF express
