= Jajpur Keonjhar Road railway station =

Railway station in Odisha, India

Jajpur Keonjhar Road
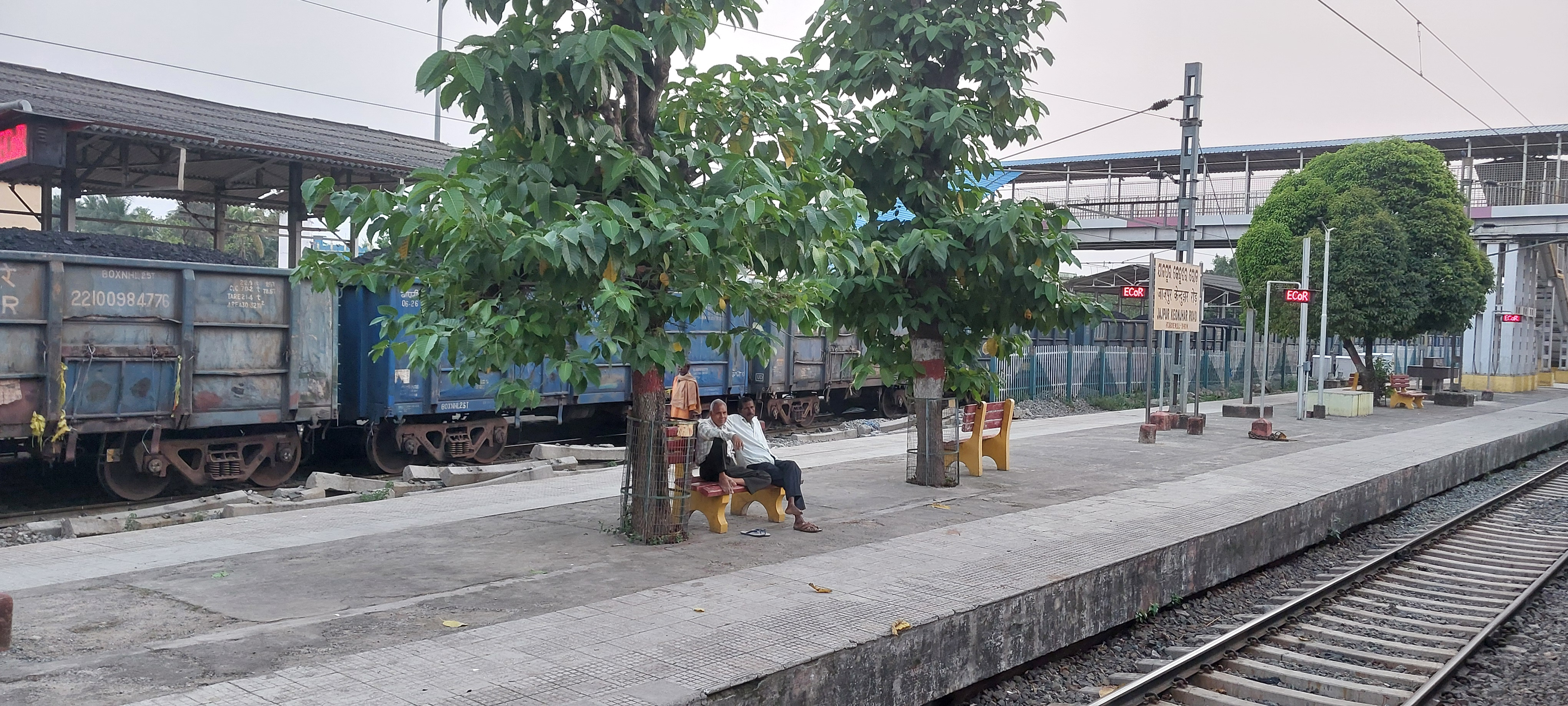
- South view(towards chennai mainline) of platform no 4&5

General information
- Location: Byasanagar, Odisha; India
- Coordinates: 20°51′00″N 86°19′48″E
- Elevation: 36 metres (118 ft)
- System: Indian Railways station
- Owner: Indian Railways
- Operator: East Coast Railway
- Platforms: 6 & 1(for goods depot/loading and unloading platform, located at different locations towards jkp)
- Tracks: 6

Construction
- Structure type: Standard on ground
- Parking: Yes
- Cycle facilities: Yes
- Accessible: Yes, It is very accessible as bus stand is located within 100 to 200 m.

Other information
- Status: Functioning
- Station code: JJKR
- Division(s): Khurda Road

History
- Opened: 1896; 130 years ago
- Rebuilt: 2025-2027l (under construction ongoing)

Passengers
- 35000+(monthly)

Services
Preceding station	Indian Railways	Following station
Korai towards Howrah Junction	East Coast Railway zone Howrah–Chennai main line	Jakhapura Junction towards Chennai Central
Location
- Location within Odisha Location within India

Jajpur Keonjhar Road railway station serves Jajpur district and Kalinganagar in Indian state of Odisha.It is the only major station located within Jajpur Road, Vyasanagar, Kalinganagar.There has been a plan to build a route/line originating from here going through Jajpur Town towards dhamara port. Jajpur Keonjhar Road – Dhamara the construction would soon commence. The track or line towards Dhamara Terminus is to be constructed post the new area allotted for the JJKR goods station. The goods stop is currently being shifted. Once the shifting is completed the renovation of JJKR towards green market (Town hall, SBI head Branch office, CHC) is to be commenced.

It would function as the south west entry and exit for the JJKR as an opposite end for the main side. Also this renovation is expected to be commenced, post the transfer of goods section to the new area and platform no 6 is to be established with the south west entry/exit front. Parking space is to be expected assuming that this end would contain facilities required for a front entry/exit point.

== Outline ==
The railway station is located at an altitude of 36 metres (118 ft). It functions within the jurisdiction of Khurda Road railway division. It is the nearest railhead for Kalinganagar, Vyasanagar Municipality/Jajpur Road. There is a plan to make a route from Jajpur Keonjhar Road towards Dhamara Port. There has been new building complex under construction besides the station Entrance cum waiting and ticketing hall.

== History ==
During the period 1893 to 1896, 1,287 km (800 mi) of the East Coast State Railway, from Vijayawada to Cuttack was built and opened to traffic, and construction of the Vijayawada–Chennai link in 1899 enabled the through running of trains along the eastern coast of India. Bengal Nagpur Railway was working on both the Howrah–Kharagpur and Kharagpur–Cuttack lines, completed the bridge over the Rupnarayan in 1900 and the Mahanadi in 1901, thus completing the through connection between Chennai and Kolkata. Since stations were not built in Keonjhar district & Jajpur, this station lied in middle of Jajpur & Keonjhar. Earlier people used this station for travelling to Keonjhar & Jajpur.

== Passenger amenities ==
Jajpur Keonjhar Road railway station has computerized reservation system (CRS), dormitory, cloak room, refreshment room, tourist information counter, post office (RMS) and ATM. & Staircase with lift integrated .
