= Paradeep–Puri Intercity Express =

Train in India

Paradeep-Puri Intercity Express
Overview
- Service type: Express
- First service: 3 January 2009; 16 years ago
- Current operator(s): East Coast Railway

Route
- Termini: Paradeep (PRDP); Puri (PURI)
- Stops: 11
- Distance travelled: 173 km (107 mi)
- Average journey time: 4 hours 25 minutes
- Service frequency: Daily
- Train number(s): 18413 / 18414

On-board services
- Class(es): General Unreserved
- Seating arrangements: Yes
- Sleeping arrangements: Yes
- Catering facilities: No
- Observation facilities: Large windows
- Baggage facilities: No
- Other facilities: Below the seats

Technical
- Rolling stock: ICF coach
- Track gauge: 1,676 mm (5 ft 6 in)
- Operating speed: 39 km/h (24 mph)
Route map
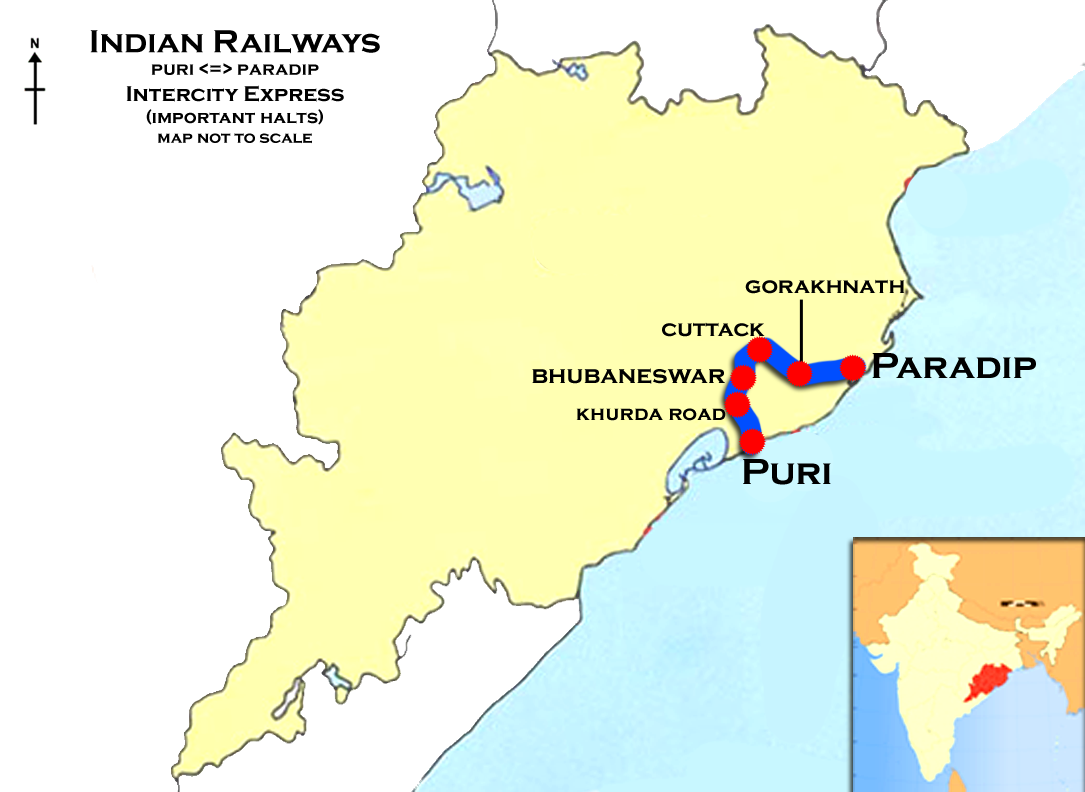

The 18413 / 18414 Paradeep-Puri Intercity Express is an express train belonging to Indian Railways-East Coast Railway zone that runs between Paradeep and Puri in India.

It operates as train number 18413 from Paradeep to Puri and as train number 18414 in the reverse direction serving the states of Odisha.

== Coaches ==
The 18413 / 14 Intercity Express has six general unreserved & two SLR (seating with luggage rake) coaches . It does not carry a pantry car coach.

As is customary with most train services in India, coach composition may be amended at the discretion of Indian Railways depending on demand.

== Service ==
The 18413 Paradeep - Puri Intercity Express covers the distance of 173 km (107 mi) in 4 hours 30 mins (46 km/h) and in 3 hours 45 mins as the 18414 Puri - Paradeep Intercity Express (46 km/h).

As the average speed of the train is lower than 55 km/h (34 mph), as per railway rules, its fare doesn't includes a Superfast surcharge.

== Routing ==
The 18413 / 14 Intercity Express runs from Paradeep via Cuttack Junction, Bhubaneswar, Khurda Road Junction to Puri.

== Traction ==
As the route is electrified, a Santragachi Loco Shed based WAP-4 electric locomotive pulls the train to its destination.
