= Puri railway station =

Railway station in Odisha, India

PURI

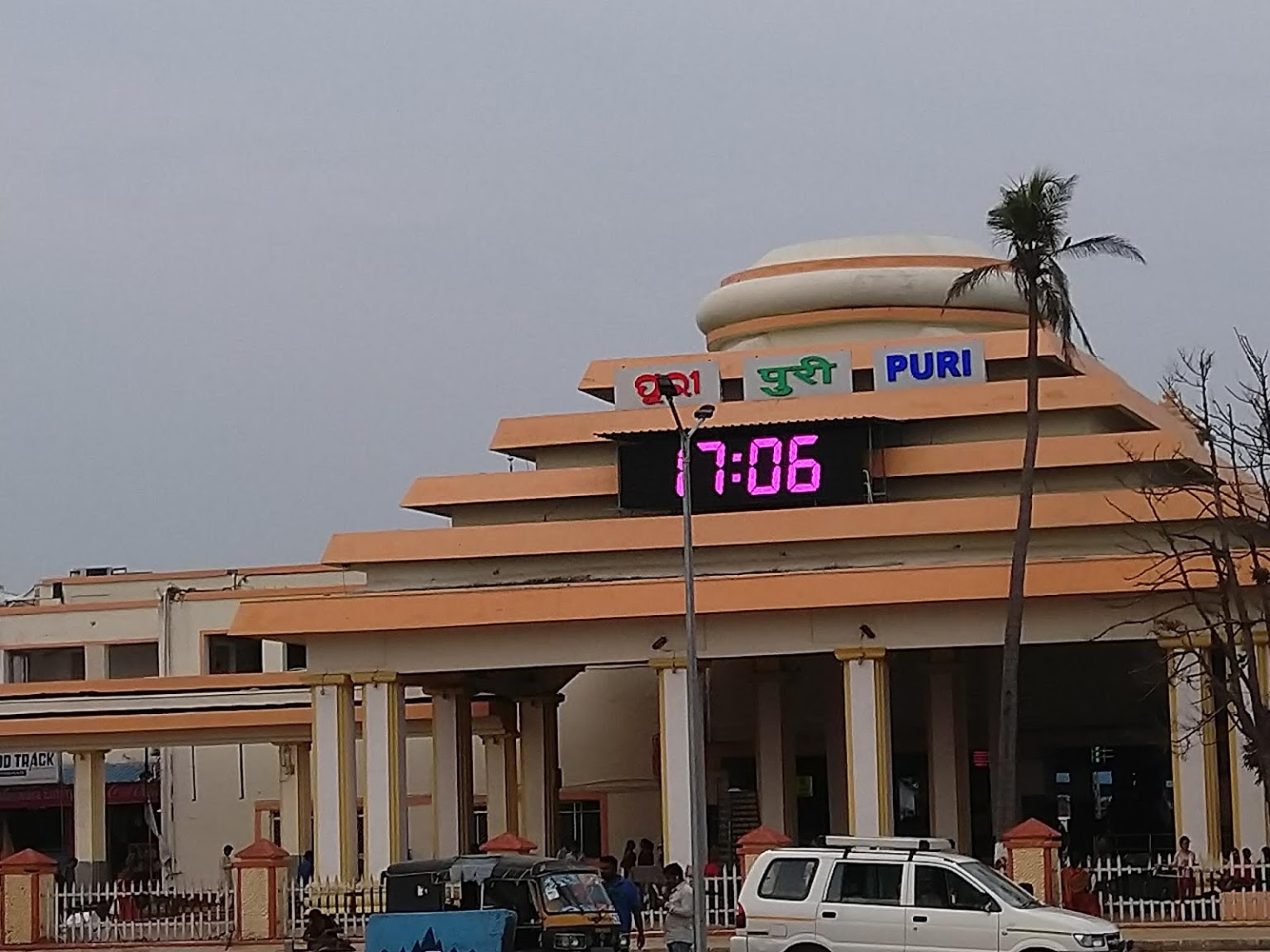
- Entrance of Puri railway station in Night

General information
- Location: Puri, Odisha; India
- Coordinates: 19°48′35″N 85°50′25″E
- Elevation: 12 m (39 ft)
- System: Express train and Passenger train station
- Owner: Indian Railways
- Operator: East Coast Railway zone
- Line: Kharagpur–Puri line
- Platforms: 8
- Tracks: 1,676 mm (5 ft 6 in)

Construction
- Structure type: Standard (on-ground station)
- Parking: Available
- Cycle facilities: Available
- Accessible: Available

Other information
- Status: Functioning
- Station code: PURI
- Zone(s): East Coast Railway zone
- Division(s): Khurda Road

History
- Opened: 1897; 129 years ago
- Former names: East Coast State Railway; Bengal Nagpur Railway
Location
- Location within Odisha Location within India
- Interactive map

Puri railway station is a terminal train station and serves Puri, the seashore temple city famous for Shri Jagannath Temple in the Indian state of Odisha. One of the most busiest railway station of Odisha.

== History ==
The Khurda Road–Puri section was opened to traffic on 1 February 1897. The railway station was renovated in 2012 into a more traditional Hindu temple structure with more facilities.

Narendra Modi will pay the foundation stone of the redevelopment work of Puri Railway Station.

=== Railway reorganization ===
The Bengal Nagpur Railway was nationalized in 1944. Eastern Railway was formed on 14 April 1952 with the portion of East Indian Railway Company east of Mughalsarai and the Bengal Nagpur Railway. In 1955, South Eastern Railway was carved out of Eastern Railway. It comprised lines mostly operated by BNR earlier. Amongst the new zones started in April 2003 were East Coast Railway and South East Central Railway. Both these railways were carved out of South Eastern Railway.

== Major trains ==
● Howrah–Puri Vande Bharat Express (22895/22896)

● Puri–Rourkela Vande Bharat Express (20835/20836)

● Howrah–Puri Shatabdi Express (12277/12278)

● Sealdah–Puri Duronto Express (22201/22202)

● Indore–Puri Humsafar Express (20917/20918)

● Puri–Kamakhya Weekly Express (via Howrah) (15643/15644)

● Puri–Kamakhya Weekly Express (via Adra) (15639/15640)

● Shalimar - Puri Sri Jagannath Express (18409/18410)

● Howrah - Puri Dhauli Express (12821/12822)

● Puri–Howrah Express (12837/12838)

● Shalimar–Puri Express (22835/22836)

● Puri–Yesvantpur Garib Rath Express (22883/22884) ● Puri–Shalimar Garib Rath Express (12881/12882)

● Puri - Patna Baidyanath dham Express (18449/18450)

● Puri–Tirupati Express (17479/17480)

● Puri–Okha Dwarka Express (20819/20820)

● Puri–Jaynagar Express (18419/18420)

● Puri - Rishikesh Kalinga Utkal Express (18477/18478)

● Puri - New Delhi Purushottam Express (12801/12802)

● Lokmanya Tilak Terminus–Puri Superfast Express (via Titlagarh) (12145/12146)

● Puri - Hatia Tapaswini Express (18451/18452)

● Puri - Anand Vihar Terminal Nandan Kanan Express (12815/12816)

● Puri - Anand Vihar Terminal Neelachal Express (12875/12876)

● Puri - Mumbai CSMT Konark Express (11019/11020)

● Lokmanya Tilak Terminus–Puri Superfast Express (22865/21866)

● Puri–Durg Express (18425/18426)

● Puri–Surat Express (22827/22828)

● Puri–Sainagar Shirdi Express (20857/20858)

● Puri–Ahmedabad Weekly Express (20861/20862)

● Gandhidham–Puri Weekly Superfast Express (12993/12994)

● Bikaner–Puri Express (20471/20472)

● Valsad–Puri Superfast Express (22909/22910)

● Puri–Barbil Express (18415/18416)

● Paradeep–Puri Intercity Express (18413/18414)

● Jodhpur-Puri Superfast Express (20814/20815)

● Bangriposi - Puri Intercity Express (12891/12892)

● Rourkela - Puri Express (18125/18126)

● Anand Vihar - Puri Superfast Express (18428/18429)

● Puri - Ajmer Express (20823/20824)

● Puri - Sonepur Express (18421/18422)

● MGR Chennai Central - Puri Superfast Express (22860/22861)

● Puri - Digha Samudra Kanya Express (22889/22890)

● Sambalpur–Puri Intercity Express (18303/18304)

● Gunupur - Puri Express (18417/18418)

● Anand Vihar Terminal - Puri Weekly Express (18428/18429)

● Puri - Rourkela Express (18125/18126)

● Puri - Bhanjpur Express (18017/18018)

● Puri - Patna Express (18405/18406)

== Gallery ==
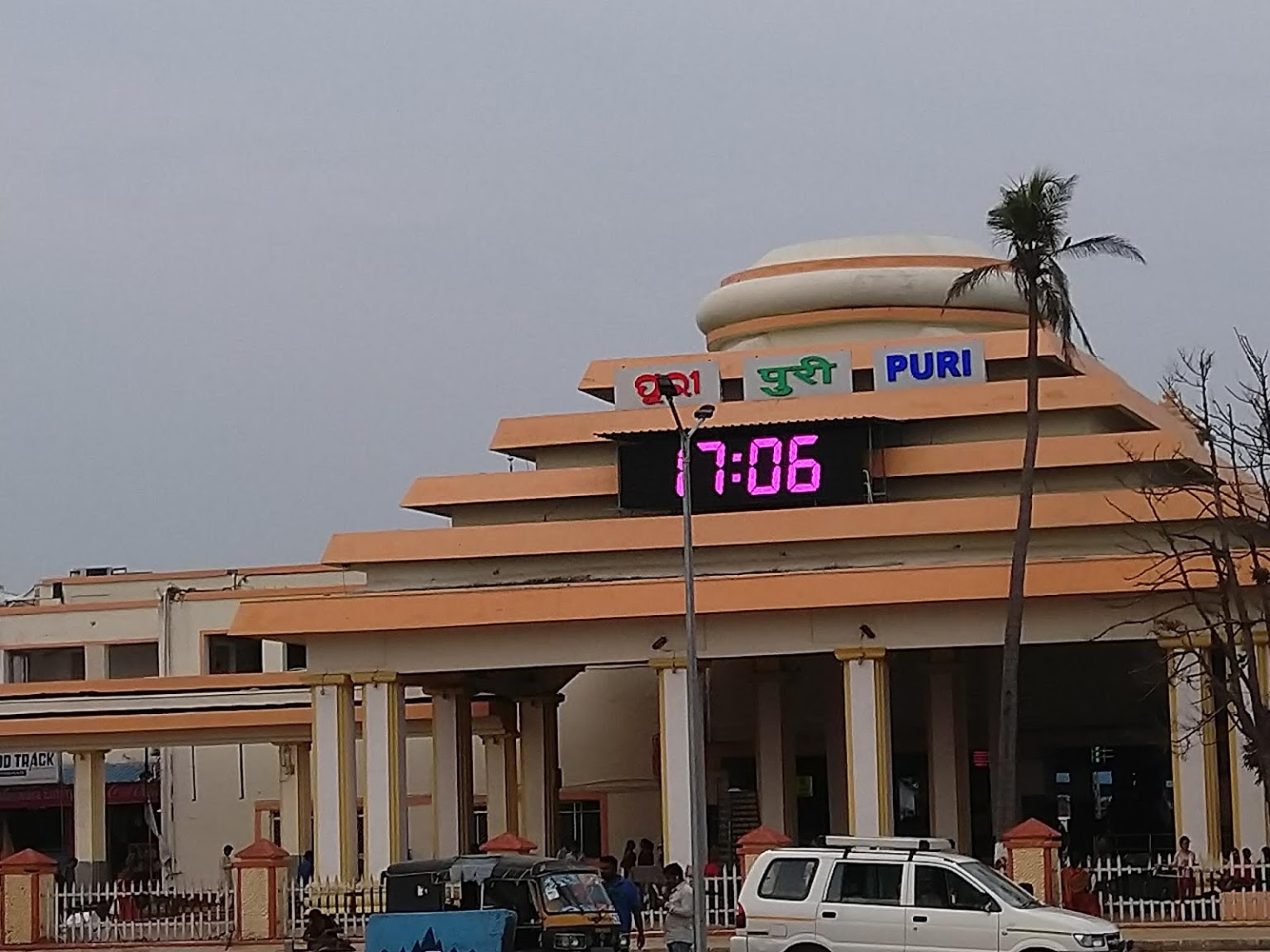
Entrance of Puri railway station

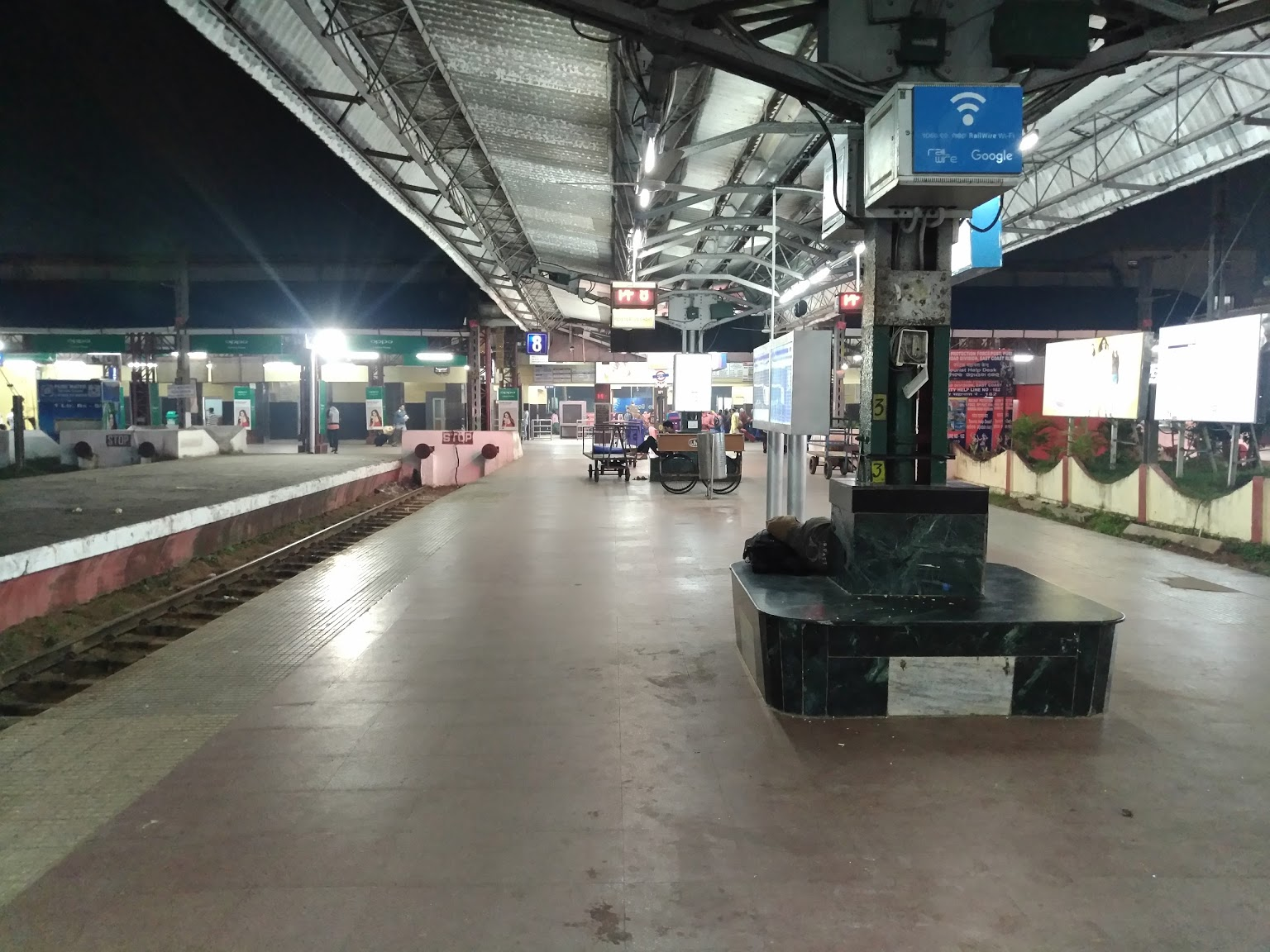
Platform of Puri railway station in Night

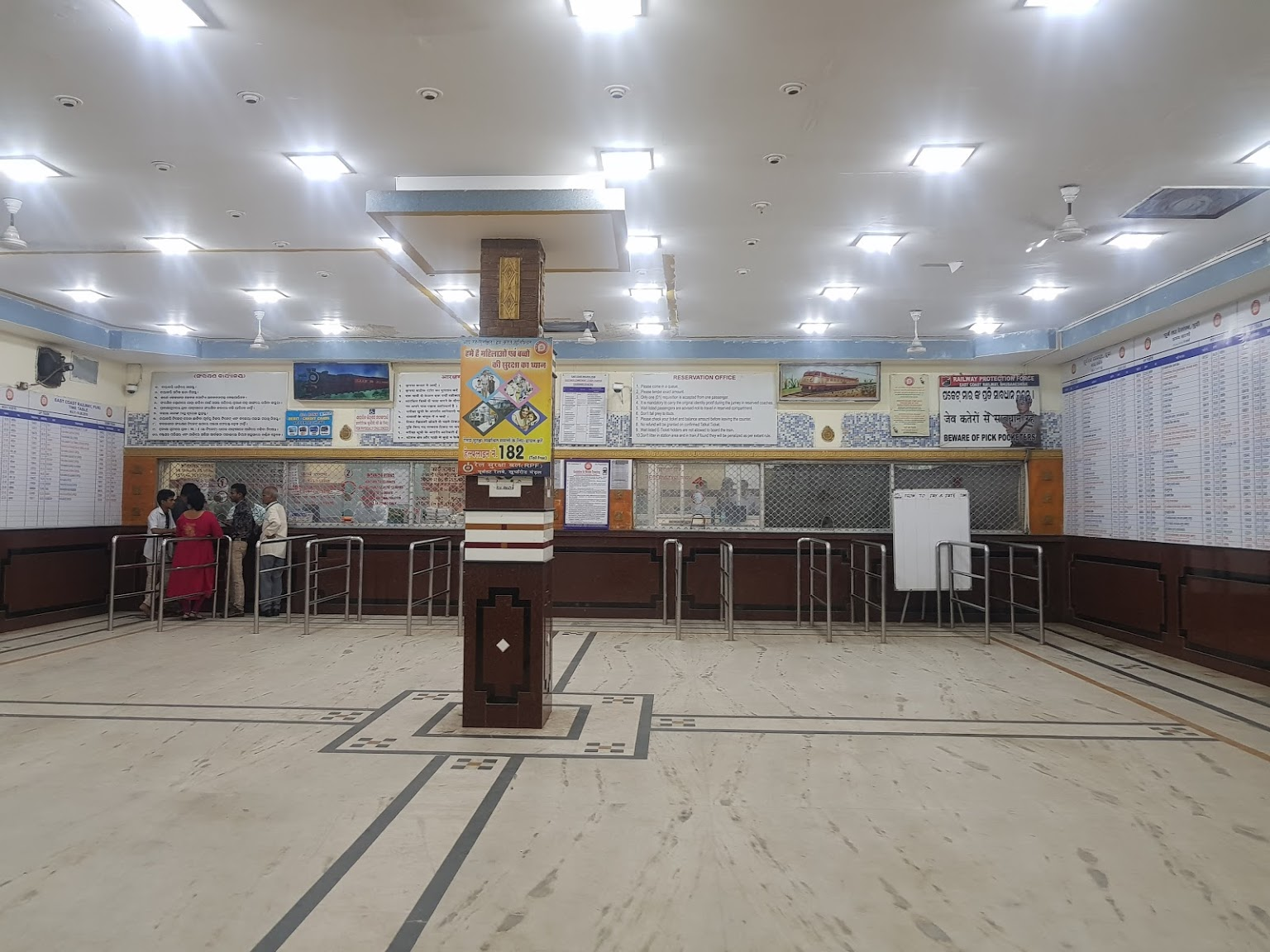
Waiting area of Puri railway station

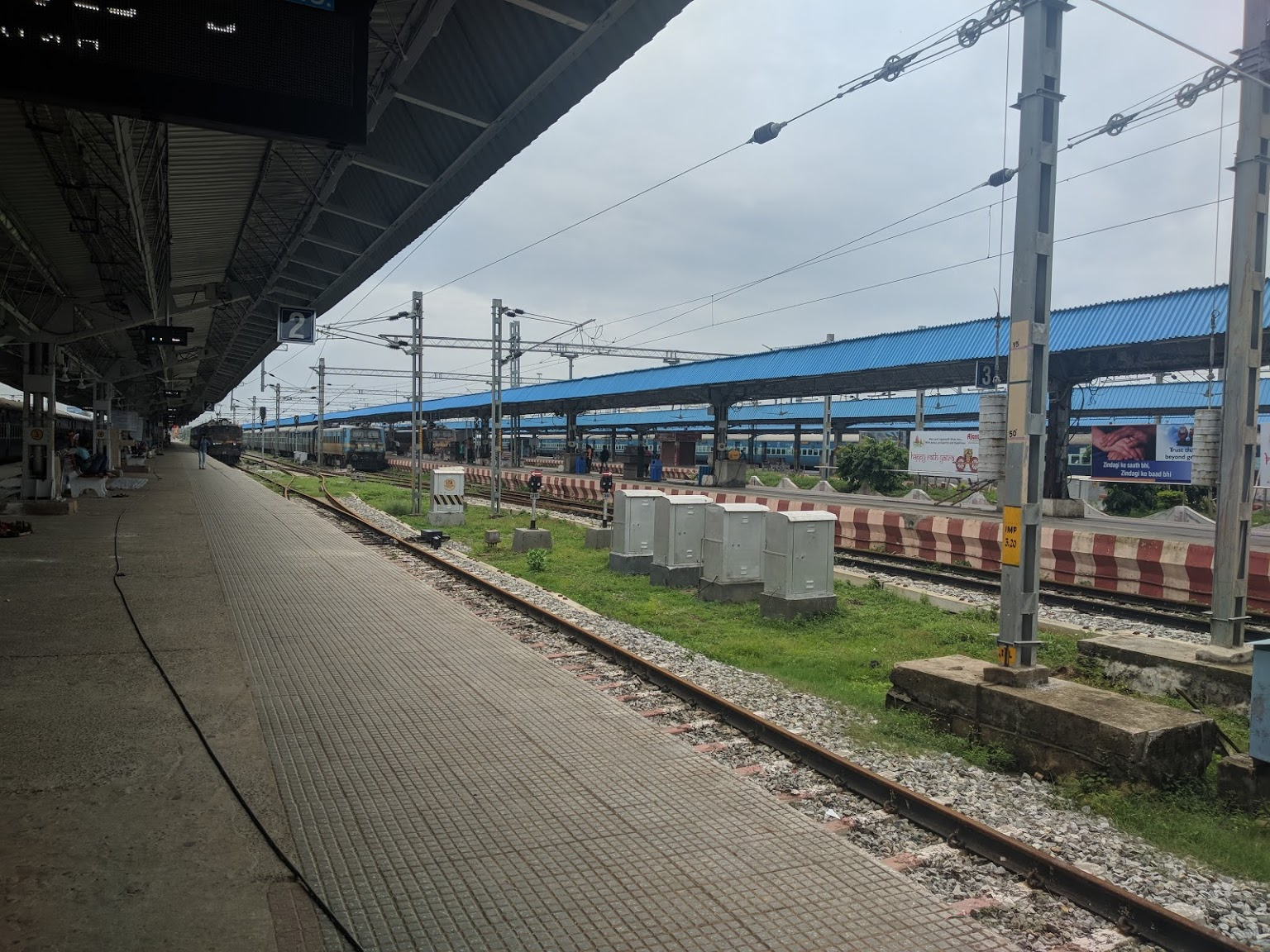
Puri railway station during day

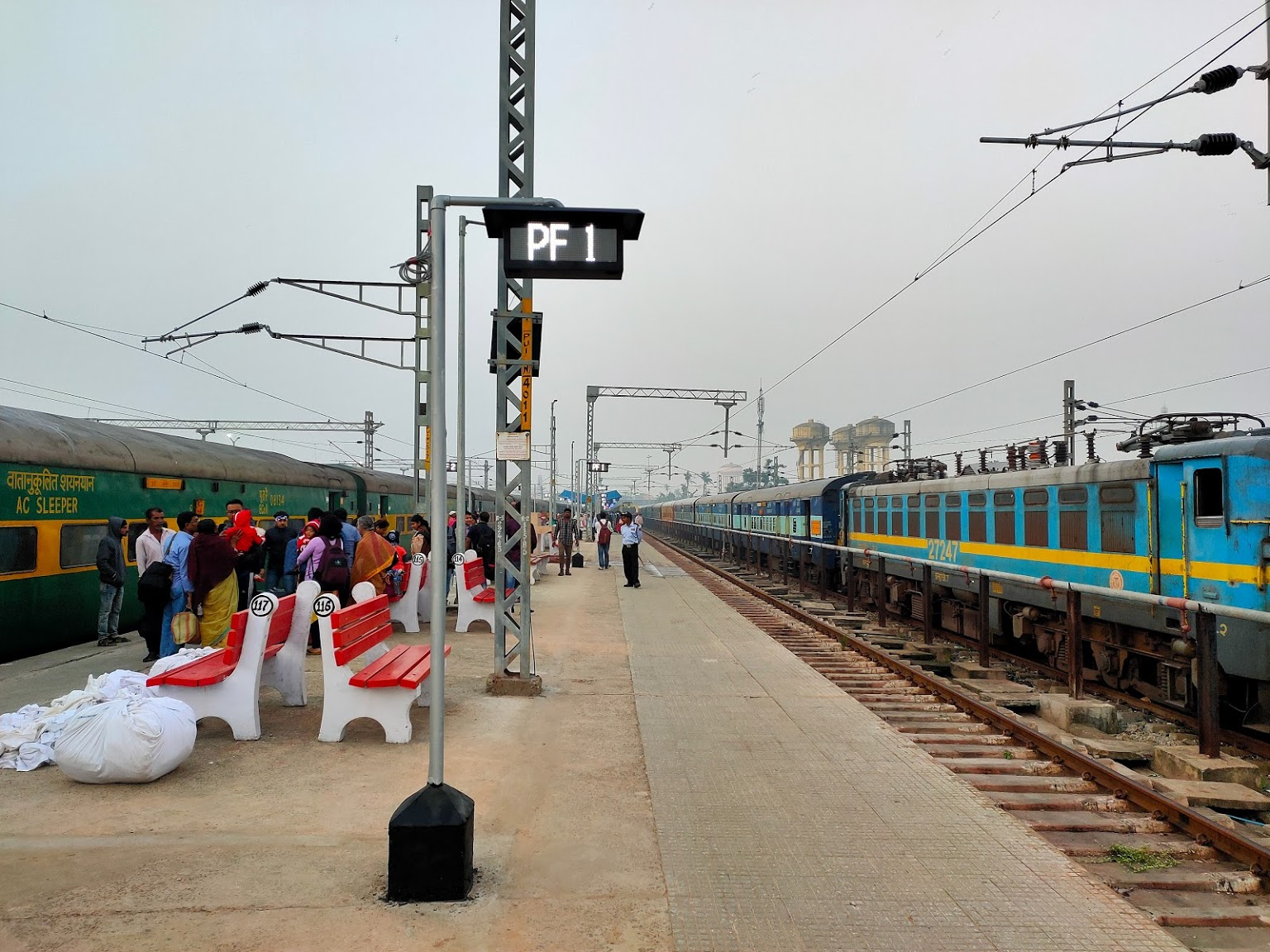
Train departing from Puri railway station

Preceding station	Indian Railways	Following station
Malatipatpur towards Kharagpur Junction	East Coast Railway zone Kharagpur–Puri line	Terminus
