= Jharsuguda–Vizianagaram line =

Railway line in India

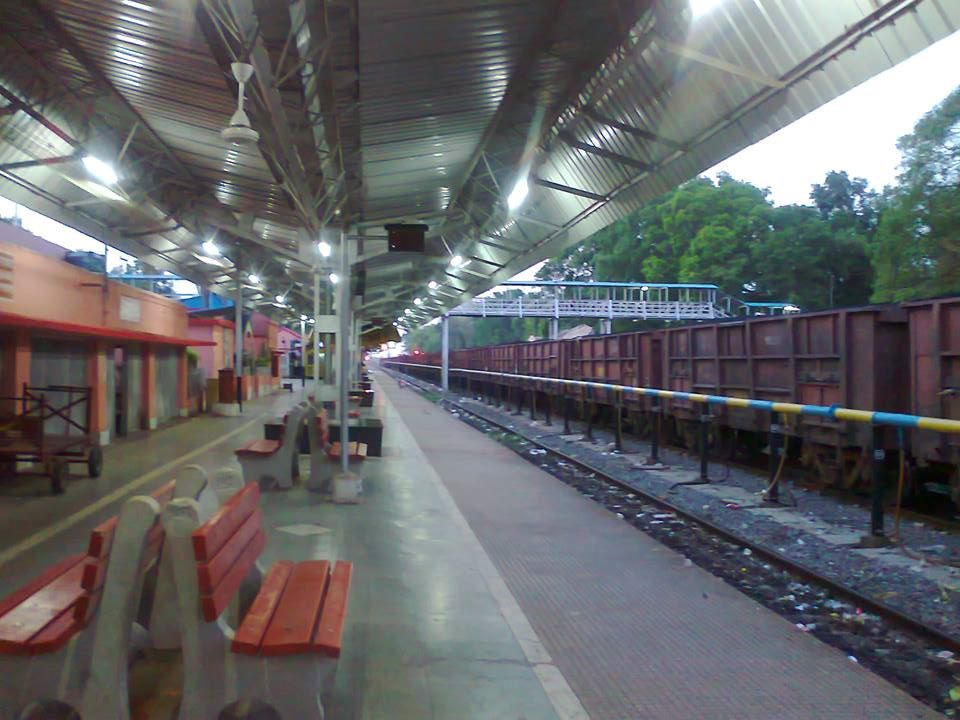
- Titilagarh railway station is an important junction on Jharsuguda–Vizianagaram line

Overview
- Status: Operational
- Owner: Indian Railways
- Locale: Odisha, Andhra Pradesh
- Termini: Jharsuguda, 516 km (321 mi) from Howrah on Howrah–Nagpur–Mumbai line; Vizianagaram, 820 km (510 mi) from Howrah on Howrah–Chennai main line
- Stations: 67 nos. 9 nos Big Junction stations at Raipur, Jharsuguda, Sambalpur, Balangir, Titlagarh, Lanjigarh, Rayagada, Bobbilli & Vizianagaram.

Service
- Services: Fully Double Electrified line from Vizianagaram to Titlagarh section & in parts in Raipur-Titlagarh-Sambalpur section. Double line construction going in Raipur-Titlagarh-Sambalpur section.
- Operator(s): South Coast Railway, East Coast Railway

History
- Opened: 1931 from Vizianagaram to Raipur; 1961 from Titlagarh to Jharsuguda.

Technical
- Track length: Jharsuguda-Titlagarh: 230 km (143 mi); Titlagarh–Vizianagaram: 266 km (165 mi); Titlagarh–Raipur: 203 km (126 mi); Rayagada–Koraput: 176 km (109 mi); Jharsuguda-Vizianagaram(end to end): 496 km (308 mi)
- Track gauge: 5 ft 6 in (1,676 mm) broad gauge
- Electrification: Yes
- Operating speed: 130 km/h

The Jharsuguda–Vizianagaram line is a railway line in eastern India. It connects Jharsuguda,516 km (321 mi) from Howrah on the Howrah–Nagpur–Mumbai line, and Titlagarh, which in turn is connected with Vizianagaram, 820 km (510 mi) from Howrah on the Howrah–Chennai main line, and Raipur Junction, 830 km (516 mi) from Howrah on the Howrah–Nagpur–Mumbai line. There are several branch lines, like the 176 km (109 mi) line connecting Rayagada with Koraput on the Kothavalasa–Kirandul line. The line traverses Western Odisha and connects the Howrah–Nagpur–Mumbai line with the Howrah–Chennai main line. It covers small portions of Chhattisgarh and Andhra Pradesh.

== Geography ==
The Jharsaguda–Titlagarh line starts from Jharsuguda, at the north western end of Odisha, on the Tatanagar–Bilaspur section of Howrah–Nagpur–Mumbai line, and goes through the Ib river valley. It crosses the Mahanadi River, downstream from Hirakud Dam. The railway track passes through hilly areas interspersed with valleys of the tributaries of the Mahanadi, the important amongst which are the Ong and Tel.

The Raipur–Titlagarh–Vizianagaram line sets off from Raipur, in the fertile Mahanadi valley of Chhattisgarh, on the Howrah–Nagpur–Mumbai line. It passes through the rocky Mahasamund district of central Chhattisgarh before entering Odisha. It enters the plains of Nuapada district in western Odisha, then through the Eastern Ghats in southern Odisha, on to the coastal plains of Andhra Pradesh. It meets the Howrah–Chennai main line at Vizianagaram.

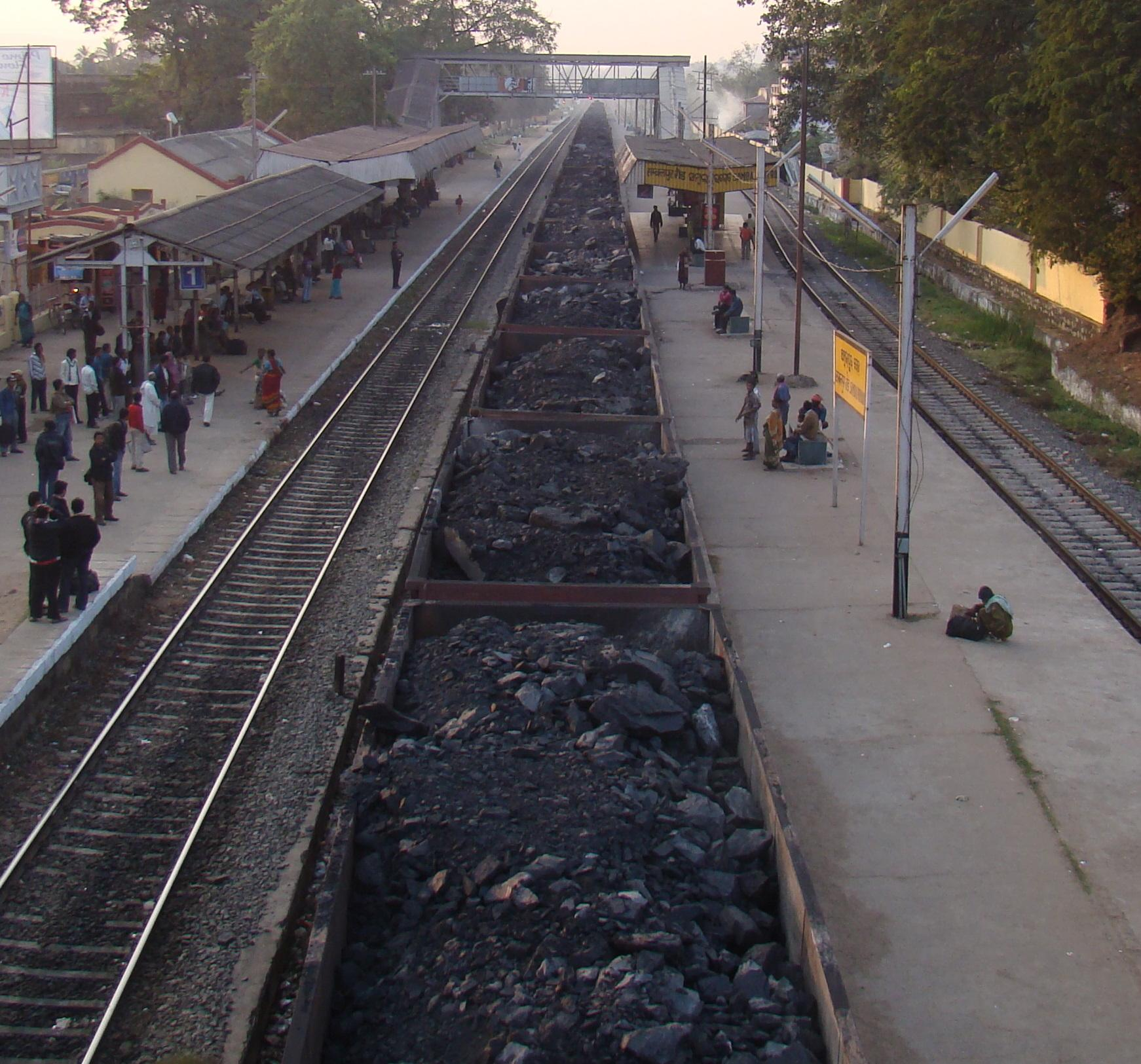
Railway rake with coal at Sambalpur Road

The area covered by this line (including branch lines) is rich in mineral resources. There are two coalfields in the area with high quantum of reserves. According to Geological Survey of India, the Talcher Coalfield has reserves of 38.65 billion tonnes, the highest in India. Ib Valley Coalfield has reserves of 22.3 billion tonnes, the third highest in India.NTPC Limited has two power stations in Odisha, both are on this line – the 3000 MW Talcher Super Thermal Power Station and the 460 MW Talcher Thermal Power Station. NTPC has planned two more super thermal power plants of 1600 MW each at Darlipalli in Sundergarh district and Gajamara in Dhenkanal district. Sterlite Energy Ltd. (of the Vedanta group) has a 2400 MW Independent Power Plant at Jharsuguda.

NALCO operates bauxite mines on Panchampatmali Hills in Koraput district of Odisha. It has an alumina refinery at Damanjodi, and a smelter and a rolled products unit at Angul. It has an 8 x 120 MW captive power plant at Angul. Vedanta Aluminium Limited (of the Vedanta group) has an aluminium smelter and a 9x135 MW captive power plant at Jharsuguda. It has an alumina refinery and 3x30 MW captive power plant at Lanjigarh.Hindalco has a smelter and a 368 MW captive power plant at Hirakud.

Bhushan Steel Limited has a presence at Meramandali in Dhenkanal district of Odisha and is currently (as of 2012) implementing a backward integration project to set up an integrated steel plant of 2.3 million tonnes per annum capacity. It has plans to further raise the capacity of the plant. Bhusan Power and Steel Limited has a presence at Thelkoloi in Jharsaguda district of Odisha.

There is an ordnance factory at Badmal in Balangir district. A plant of the engine division of Hindustan Aeronautics Limited is located at Sunabeda, Koraput. It is on the Visakhapatnam-Kirandaul line.

== History ==
The mainline of Bengal Nagpur Railway from Nagpur to Asansol was opened for goods traffic on 1 February 1891. Between 1893 and 1896, 1,288 km (800 mi) of the historical East Coast Railway was opened for traffic. In 1898–99, two important lines of BNR, namely Sini–Kharagpur–Kolaghat and Kharagpur–Cuttack were opened, thereby linking BNR to the lines in southern India.

The Sambalpur—Titalgarh Railway line is approximately Rs 11 crores of aid from the Japanese and 4.2 crores from the US. The foreign exchange Is coming out of the U.S. President Asian economic Development Fund and we are getting 20 million dollars. Japan has promised 8 million dollars. We have been promised all that and the purposes this foreign exchange will be used for rails and other materials. Formerly the line was to go from Sambalpur to Kantangunji. Subsequently, we found that Kantangunji via Bolangir and Titalgarh would be saving 20 miles, and investigations are going on those lines.

The 78 km (48 mi) Vizianagaram–Parvatipuram line was opened in 1908–09 and an 33 km (21 mi) extension to Salur was built in 1913. The 390 km (242 mi) long Parvatipuram–Raipur line was completed in 1931. In 1922, the Talcher Coalfield was linked with the Howrah–Chennai line.

In 1960, Indian Railway took up three projects: the Kottavalasa–Koraput–Jeypore–Kirandaul line (Dandakaranya Project), the Titlagarh–Bolangir–Jharsuguda Project and the Rourkela–Kiriburu Project. All the three projects taken together were popularly known as the DBK Project or the Dandakaranya Bolangir Kiriburu Project. The Sambalpur–Titlagarh line was opened to traffic in 1963.

The Sambalpur–Talcher line was sanctioned in 1983 and was completed in 1998.

The Koraput–Rayagada Rail Link Project was completed on 31 December 1998.

=== Railway reorganization ===
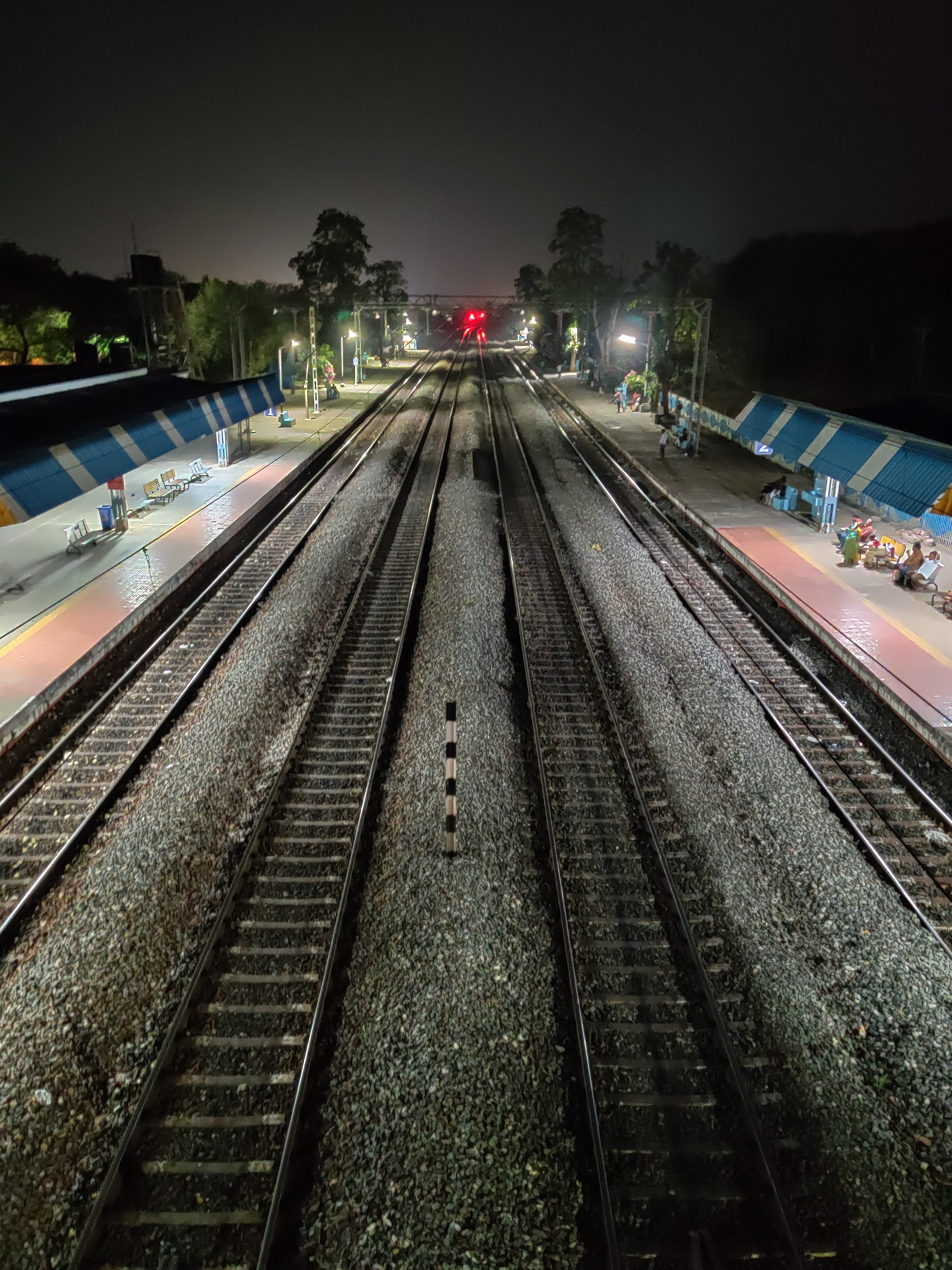
Railway line near Gajapatinagaram

The Bengal Nagpur Railway was nationalized in 1944.Eastern Railway was formed on 14 April 1952 with the portion of East Indian Railway Company east of Mughalsarai and the Bengal Nagpur Railway. In 1955, South Eastern Railway was carved out of Eastern Railway. It comprised lines mostly operated by BNR earlier. Amongst the new zones started in April 2003 were East Coast Railway and South East Central Railway. Both these railways were carved out of South Eastern Railway. Doubling of Vizianagaram–Gajapatinagaram completed by 31 March 2002. The doubling of Bobbili–Gajapatinagaram completed by 30 June 2004.

== New lines ==
=== Balangir–Khurda Road project ===
The 289-kilometre-long (180 mi) railway line, now (as of 2012) under construction from Balangir on the Jharsuguda–Titlagrh line to Khurda Road on the Howrah–Chennai main line, will pass through Subarnapur, Boudh and Nayagarh. It would require construction of 11 tunnels measuring 6.30 km in all, and around 435 bridges including one 660-metre-long (2,165 ft) bridge over the Tel River.

In 1945 this rail link was first surveyed by the Bengal Nagpur Railway, which thought Bhubaneswar's link with some of the most backward undivided districts of Odisha, namely Balangir, Kalahandi, Koraput and Phulbani, to be important. The project actually got off in 1994.

The project was initially hit by delays in land acquisition and even after it got off progress was slow. According to Shivaji Patnaik, the veteran Communist Party of India (Marxist) leader, "The construction for the project started way back in 1994. After 17 years, not even 36 km of line is developed."

A 175-kilometre-long (109 mi) Phulbani–Berhampur broad-gauge link is planned.

=== Bimalagarh–Talcher project ===
Another new line project lagging behind is the 156-kilometre-long (97 mi) line connecting Bimlagarh on the Rourkela–Barsuan branch line and Talcher on the Cuttack–Sambalpur line, sanctioned in 2004–05. This line when complete would reduce the distance between Rourkela and Bhubaneswar from 460 km (via Sambalpur) to 300 km.

=== Angul–Sukinda Road project ===
Construction of the 102-kilometre-long (63 mi) railway track linking Angul on the Sambalpur–Talcher–Barang branch line to Sukinda Road on the Padapahar–Jakhapura branch line is expected to be initiated in 2013, after clearing all land-acquisition related problems. This line is being taken up on the public–private partnership (PPP) mode in partnership between Rail Vikas Nigam Limited, Government of Odisha, Jindal Steel and Power and Bhushan Power and Steel. The new railway track will provide connectivity between Talcher Coalfield and the Padapahar–Jakhapura branch line with iron ore mines and upcoming industries. A number of mega steel projects are coming up in this region.

=== Vizianagaram–Titlagarh third line ===
Vizianagaram–Titlagarh third line project will be constructed at an estimated cost of Rs 2,335.68 crore. The third line, which comes under the East Coast Railway is an alternative route to the over-burdened existing line. The length of the railway line will be 264.6 km. The project will be completed within five years i.e. 2021.

=== Other projects ===
Several new lines have been planned. These include the 245-kilometre-long (152 mi) Talcher–Hindol Road–Berhampur–Gopalpur line, and the 120-kilometre-long (75 mi) Bargarh–Nawapara Road line via Padampur.

Construction of the 52-kilometre-long (32 mi) Jharsuguda–Barpalli rail line is essential for transportation of coal from the Ib Valley Coalfield with a potential of 90 million tonnes per annum. Mahanadi Coalfields Limited will fund this project.

== Electrification ==
The Koraput–Damanjodi section was electrified in 1988–89. The Barang–Rajatgarh–Meramandoli section was electrified in 2002–03. Rajatgarh–Kapilas Road was electrified in 2003–04.

Electrification of the Titlagarh–Sambalpur–Jharsuguda and Angul–Sambalpur sections were sanctioned in the Railway Budget for 2012–13 dedicated to nation by Prime minister Narendra Modi on 15 January 2019. Traction work started in Vizianagaram–Jharsuguda section.

== Electrification work ==
Electrification work from Vizianagaram to Titlagarh has been completed in 2017–18. Also, single line electrification work was completed from Titlagarh–Sambalpur–Jharsuguda section just electric line doubling in Titlagarh–Sambalpur section is also completed.

== Track ==
Doubling of several lines have been sanctioned in the budget for 2012–13: Jharsaguda–Sambalpur, Sambalpur–Titlagarh, Raipur–Mahasamund–Titlagarh, Sambalpur–Talcher, Lapanga–Brundamal, Angul–Kerejang, Rajatgarh–Barang.

The Ministry of Coal has identified the Talcher area as one of the major areas for coal production. Additionally, a number of coal blocks are being developed by the private sector. About 100 million tonnes of incremental coal freight is expected. Doubling of Talcher–Sambalpur, Sambalpur–Jharsuguda, Sambalpur–Titlagarh and Titlagarh–Mahasamund–Raipur has been sanctioned and work is in progress.
