= Brajarajnagar =

Town in Odisha, India

Brajrajnagar
- Town
- Location in Odisha, India Brajrajnagar (India)
- Coordinates: 21.82°N 83.92°E
- Country: India
- State: Odisha
- District: Jharsuguda

Area
  - Total: 43 km^{2} (17 sq mi)
- Elevation: 216 m (709 ft)

Population (2011)
  - Total: 80,403
  - Density: 1,900/km^{2} (4,800/sq mi)

Languages
  - Official: Odia
- Time zone: UTC+5:30 (IST)
- PIN: 768216
- Telephone code: 06645
- Vehicle registration: OD-23
- Website: odisha.gov.in

Brajrajnagar is a town and a municipality in Jharsuguda district in the state of Odisha, India. Popular legend says the town was named after Braj Mohan Birla after he set up Orient Paper Mills in 1936. It is a small sleepy town on rocky terrain, built on the banks of Ib river, with temples mostly built by the Birlas. Later it became famous for MCL-owned coal mines after Orient Paper Mills of Birlas managed by dulichand Hanuman Prasad shah closed down in 1999.

Most of the population in this city were working for Orient Paper Mills, which belonged to Birla Group of industries. Brajrajnagar has in its vicinity numerous open-cast and underground coal mines of Ib Valley Coalfield and Orient Colliery Area belonging to government-owned Mahanadi Coalfields Limited (MCL).

== History ==
The Brajrajnagar Police Station was established in 1936, in the same year, when the Orient Paper Mills of Birlas was established here. The mill started functioning in 1939, leading to the growth of township around it, inhabited by the employees, which was managed by Dulichand Hanuman Prasad Shah.

Eventually, Brajrajnagar became a Nagar Panchayat (Notified Area Council) (NAC) in 1968, and in 1989 it was made a Nagar Palika (Municipality), spread over an area of 42.73 km^{2}. and includes seven revenue villages, Lamtibahal, Telenpali, Remja, Lajkura, Gandghora, Katabaga and Sanjob.

== Geography ==
Brajarajnagar is located at 21.82°N 83.92°E. It has an average elevation of 216 metres (708 feet). Ib River, which is a tributary of Mahanadi river, flows to the east of the town.

Brajrajnagar vidhan sabha consists of vast area of Brajrajnagar, Belpahar, Bandhbahal, Gopalpur, Kanaktura border of Chhattisgarh. Moreover, Brajrajnagar forest range also has very large area which includes area in Remenda, Banharpali, Kudopali, Tilya, Sonari, Rajpur, Rampur, Loising, Barakhandia, Pathrapali, etc. Brajrajnagar also has very large area which includes many villages like Remja, Telenpali, Khaliakani, Gandaghora, Khaliamal, Nuadihi, Gandhichowk, Badheikata, Barghat Quarter, Junenmunda, 9number, Lamtibahal, Mandalia, Hilltop colony, BhootBanglouw, GMcomplex, Minesrescue station, Sanjob, Badjob, Kusamunda, ESIchowk, Sargimal, Baghrachaka, Ainlapali, Amdarha, Baghiaberna, Balangibahal, Baliput, Barpali, Beleidhuda, Bhoimunda, Bundia, Chandnimal, Charbhati, Chelkuthi, Chichinda, Deogaon, Ghusuramunda, Gourmal, Kandakuda, Katapali, Kechhobahal, Koilaga, Kudopali, Loising, Madhupur, Naikdihi, Niktimal, Nuamunda, Rajpur, Rankata, Tharkaspur and Tileimal.

== Demographics ==
As of 2011 India census, Brajarajnagar had a population of 80,403. Males constitute 52% of the population and females 48%. Brajarajnagar has an average literacy rate of 69%, higher than the national average of 59.5%; with male literacy of 77% and female literacy of 60%. 12% of the population is under 6 years of age.

== Place of Interest ==
- Chandi Mandir, Brajrajnagar
- Laxmi Narayan Temple, Brajrajnagar
- Birla Temple (Shiv Mandir), near Lamtibahal, Brajrajnagar
- Ib Bridge
- Lal Pathar
- Satya Sai Mandir
- Barghat Mandir
- Underground and Open cast Mines
- Cineplex (Vikram Talkies) - Single screen advanced cinema hall
- Maa Mulagudi Mandir (Gandghora)
- Maa Samalei Mandir (Rajpur)
- Shiv Mandir (Nuadihi)
- Shirdi Sai Mandir (Gandhi Chowk)

== Industry ==
Brajrajnagar had one large paper mill named Orient Paper Mills of Birlas (managed by dulichand Hanuman Prasad shah) which happens to be the oldest industry in the state of Odisha, having set up in the year 1936 and production being started in 1939. Though since 1999, the O.P.M of Brajrajnagar has been shut down. Since then, thousand of workers have either shifted to the O.P.M. at Amlai, Madhya Pradesh or are working at MCL Brajrajnagar.

The Ib Valley Coal Area is also in Brajrajnagar and nearby areas. Prior to nationalization in the year 1973, three underground mines were operational in Brajrajnagar. Post nationalization, the Ib valley Opencast Mines were opened from 1984 onwards. At present Ib Valley Area consists of three Opencast Mines namely Lajkura Opencast mine, Samleswari Opencast mine and Lilari Opencast mine. And all the underground mines are operational in Orient Colliery Area.

National Aluminium Company Ltd, a government owned company, is planning to set up an Aluminium smelter plant and one of the largest power plant near the town.

TRL Krosaki Refractories Limited (formerly Tata Refractories Limited, )[1] is an Indian refractory company. It was established in 1958 in Belpahar, a city in Jharsuguda district of Odisha.

It mainly produces basic, dolomite, high alumina, monolithics, silica, flow control products and tap hole clay refractories having a consolidated installed capacity of 304,760 tonnes per annum.

== Transport ==
=== Road ===
Brajarajnagar falls on National Highway 49 (NH 49) which connects Bilaspur, of Chhattisgarh to Kharagpur in West Bengal. Many Private buses runs daily service to major cities of Odisha such as Bhubaneswar, Cuttack, Berhampur, Rourkela and Sambalpur.

=== Railways ===
Brajrajnagar Railway Station (BRJN) is a station on the Tatanagar–Bilaspur section of Howrah-Nagpur-Mumbai line. It is managed by Bilaspur division of South East Central Railway. It serves as important loading point for various coal-mines located in this area of Odisha. Brajrajnagar railway station is well connected with trains from Howrah, Mumbai, New Delhi, Bhubaneswar and Ahmedabad. Jharsuguda which is 11 km away is connected from the rest of the country including Chennai and Bangalore. It has another railway station, Ib which is 1.5 km away from Brajrajnagar.

=== Airport ===
The closest airports are the Veer Surendra Sai Airport, Jharsuguda (15 km), Bilasa Devi Kenvat Airport, Bilaspur (219 km), Swami Vivekananda Airport, Raipur (319 km), Birsa Munda Airport, Ranchi (351 km) and Biju Patnaik International Airport, Bhubaneswar (360 km).

In 2009, the Airports Authority of India decided to set-up the second domestic airport in the state of Odisha at Jharsuguda. After completion in 2012, Jharsuguda Airport became the nearest airport to reach Brajrajnagar (20 km). Air Odisha launched non-scheduled commercial flights between Rourkela, Jharsuguda and Bhubaneswar on 2 November 2012.

== Communication and Internet ==
=== 2G, 3G, 4G, 5G, Broadband ===
Brajrajnagar has Reliance Jio, BSNL, Airtel, Idea 4G services for fast Internet services as well as BSNL Broadband Internet services. There are various 3G, 2G service providers in brajrajnagar like Aircel, Airtel, BSNL, Reliance, Vodafone, Docomo, Idea and much more. BSNL landline also provides telephone services.

== Politics ==
The current MLA from Brajarajnagar Assembly Constituency is Mr. Suresh pujari of BJP, who won the seat in State general elections of 2024. he defeating Mrs Alka who won the seat in State by-elections of 2022(which was held after sudden demise of her husband) Mr Anup Kumar Sai is three times MLA in Brajraj Nagar assembly constituency from 2001to2014 Mr. Keshba Chandra Sahu had won this seat in 1999 for 17 months and before him, Mr. Prasanna Kumar Panda of CPI had won this seat in 1995, 1990 and in 1985. Mr. Upendra Dikshit had won this seat as INC(I) candidate in 1980 and as INC candidate in 1977.

It was a part of Deogarh (Lok Sabha constituency), though now it is a part of Bargarh (Lok Sabha constituency), after a new Lok Sabha constituency was created after 2008 delimitation of parliamentary constituencies based on the recommendations of the Delimitation Commission of India in 2002. Mr.Suresh Pujari of BJP is currently the M.P. from Bargarh (Lok Sabha constituency).

== Education ==
1. Believers Church Residential School
2. Gandghora High School
3. Neheru Memorial M.E. School, Rajpur
4. Rampur Colliery High School
5. Bundia High School
6. Kudopali High School
7. O.P.M Boys High School
8. O.P.M Girls High School
9. H Line Girls High School
10. Lamtibahal High School
11. Siksha Niketan
12. DAV public school
13. Daniel Public School
14. Little Angels' SR. Sec School
15. Srima Arabina High School
16. Saraswati Shishu Vidya Mandir

There are also other secondary schools.

== Festivals observed ==
Major festivals celebrated in the Brajrajnagar are:

- Nuakhai: This is an important festival for the people of Western Odisha. An agricultural festival celebrated to welcome the new rice of the season. Families gather during this period and eat together. After that, the younger take the blessings of elders and dance with friends.
- Bhai Jiyuntia: A festival observed by the women of this region where a sister prays for the betterment of her brother.
- Rath Yatra: Rath Yatra is celebrated in the town & near by villages of Brajarajnagar.
- Durga Puja: Durga Puja has been celebrated in public pandals in the town for more than half a century. Specially Durga pandals of Gandhi Chowk, Black Diamond (Mandalia), Hill Top Colony and ESI Chowk is very devotional. The puja pandal of OPM (Golchakkar) is one of the oldest celebrated Durga puja of town. Besides these it is also celebrated in various temples of town.
- Ganesh Puja: Ganesh Puja is celebrated all over the town including various schools and colleges.
- Diwali and Chath: It is celebrated with great pomp and show.
- Makar Sankranti: It is celebrated with great pomp and show in Khaliakani of the town.
- Gokulashtami (Prathamastami) Yatra is one of the oldest celebrated festival observed in Rajpur village.
- Nagachaturthi Yatra is one of the oldest celebrated in Nuadihi village.
- Shirdi Sai Palki Yatra is a festival observed on the day of Makar Sankranti.

== Places of interest ==
1. Chandi Mandir, Brajrajnagar
2. Laxmi Narayan Temple, Brajrajnagar
3. Birla Temple (Shiv Mandir), near Lamtibahal, Brajrajnagar
4. Ib Bridge
5. Lal Pathar
6. Satya Sai Mandir
7. Barghat Mandir
8. Underground and Open cast Mines
9. Cineplex (Vikram Talkies) - Single screen advanced cinema hall
10. Maa Mulagudi Mandir (Gandghora)
