= Black Diamond Museum, Angul =

Cultural museum and library in Angul, Odisha

Black Diamond Museum & Library
- ବ୍ଲାକ୍ ଡାୟମଣ୍ଡ ମ୍ୟୁଜିୟମ୍ ଏବଂ ଲାଇବ୍ରେରି
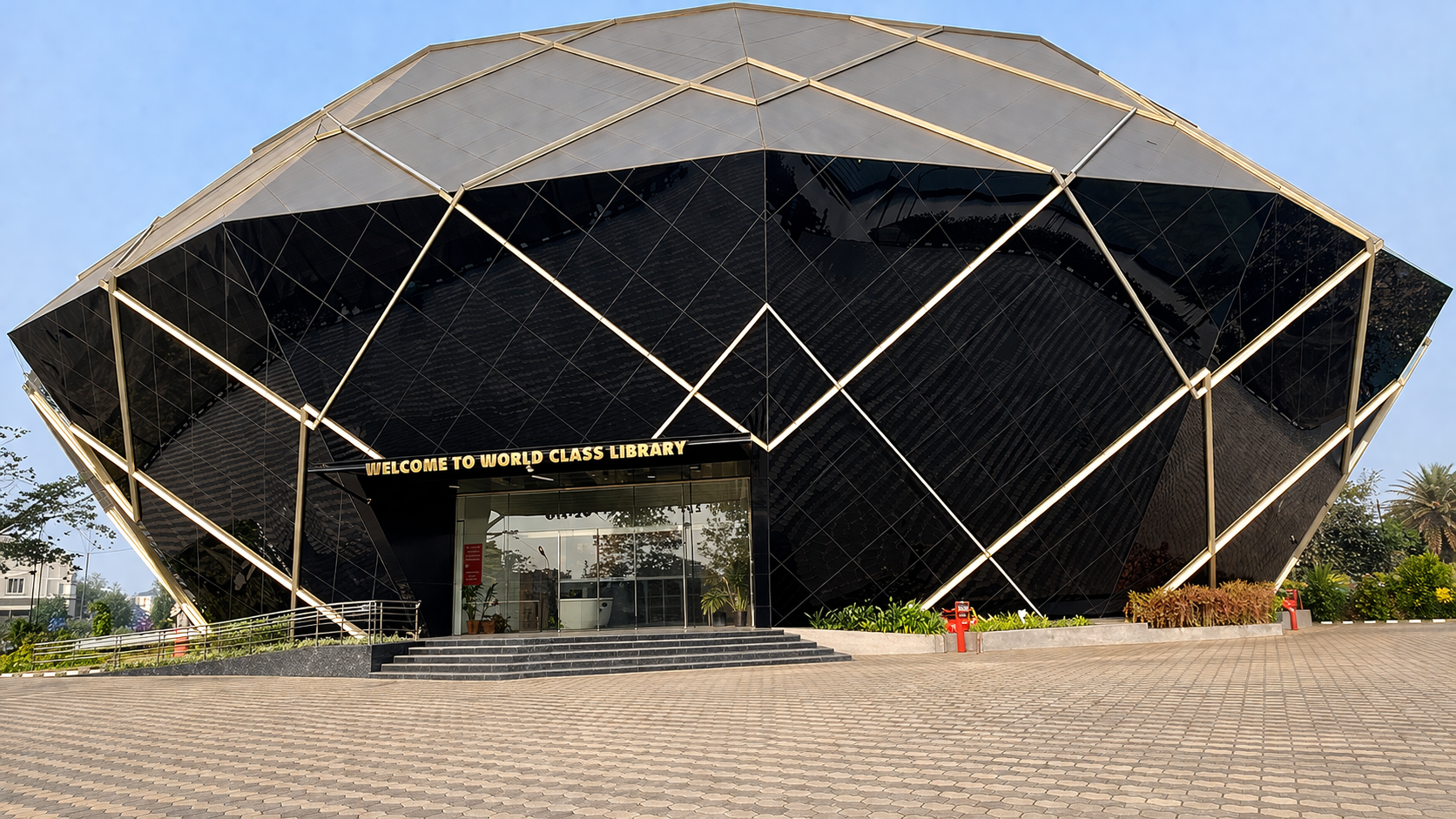
- Entrance signage at the Black Diamond Museum and Library in Angul, Odisha

- Location in Odisha Location in India
- Established: 1 January 2024
- Location: Angul, Odisha, India
- Coordinates: 20.84°N 85.15°E
- Type: Coal museum and library
- Collections: Coal mining artifacts and literature
- Founders: Government of Odisha; Mahanadi Coalfields Limited (MCL)
- Owner: Government of Odisha
- Website: https://angul.odisha.gov.in/
- Area: 152,460 square feet (3.50 acres)
- Budget: ₹25 crore (approx. US$2.7 million)

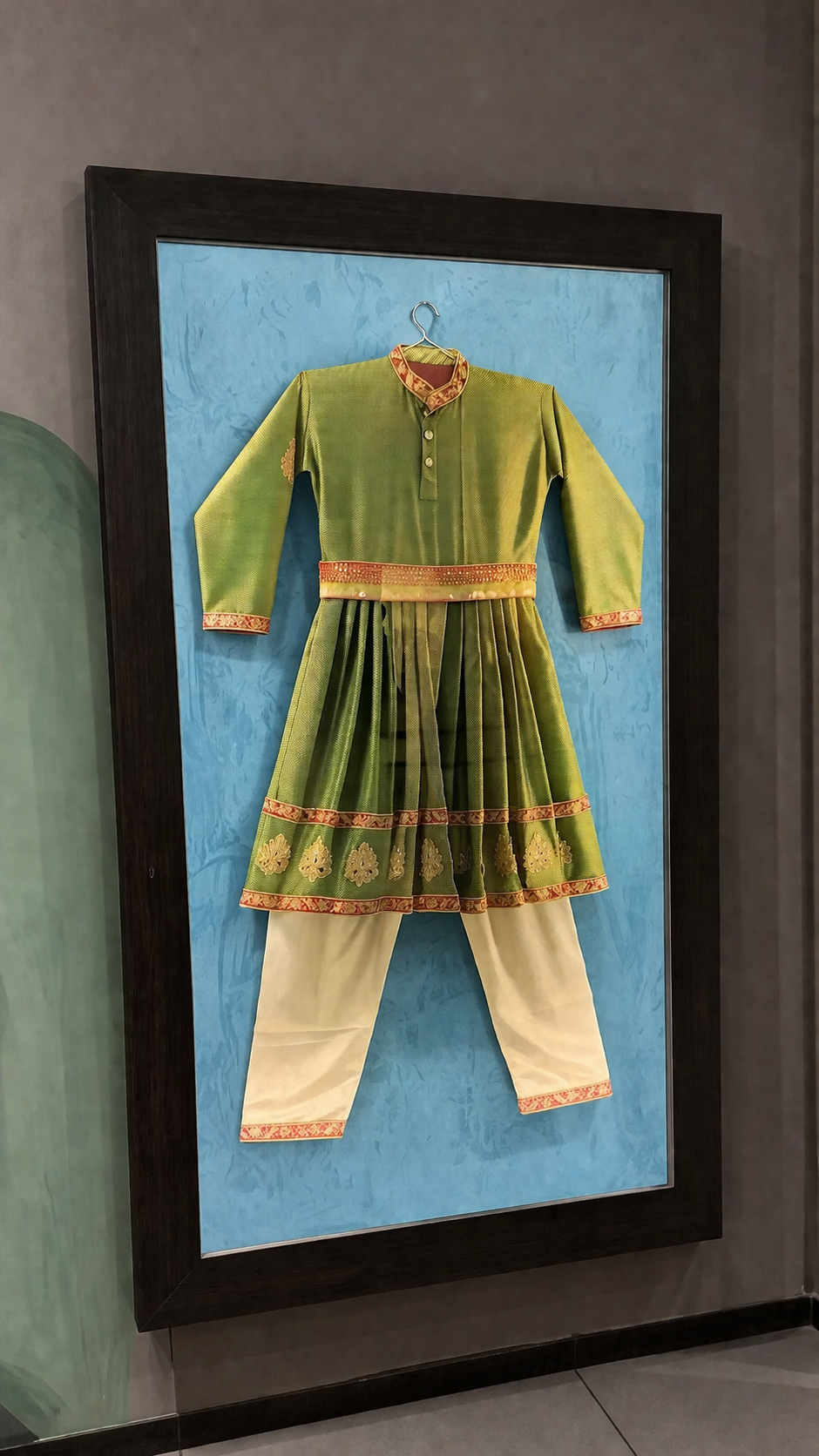
Traditional attire attributed to King Somnath Singh Jagdev, displayed at the Black Diamond Museum and Library, Angul, Odisha.

Black Diamond Museum and Library (Odia: ବ୍ଲାକ୍ ଡାୟମଣ୍ଡ ମ୍ୟୁଜିୟମ୍ ଏବଂ ଲାଇବ୍ରେରି; Oriya: Blāk ḍāyamaṇḍ myujiẏam ebaṁ lāibreri, pronounced [Blāk ḍāyamaṇḍ myujiẏam ebaṁ lāibreri]), popularly known as Black Diamond Museum or Black Diamond Complex, is a digital combined cultural museum and library located in Angul, Odisha. Established in 2024, it focuses on preservation of the history, technology, and heritage of coal mining in the Talcher coalfields and the Angul region.

== Etymology ==
The name "Black Diamond" is a commonly used metaphor for coal. The term refers to coal's economic importance as a natural resource. The name is associated with the Talcher coalfields in Angul district, one of the major coal producing regions in India. The region is sometimes referred to as “City of Black Diamond”, from which the museum derives its name.

== History ==
In late 2020, the Angul district administration announced plans for the Black Diamond Museum. A three-storey building on a 3.5-acre site was proposed, with groundwork to begin immediately and construction expected to finish within about 18 months. Reports described the proposed museum as one of the first digital coal museums in India, promising information about coal and its mining.

=== Funding and construction ===
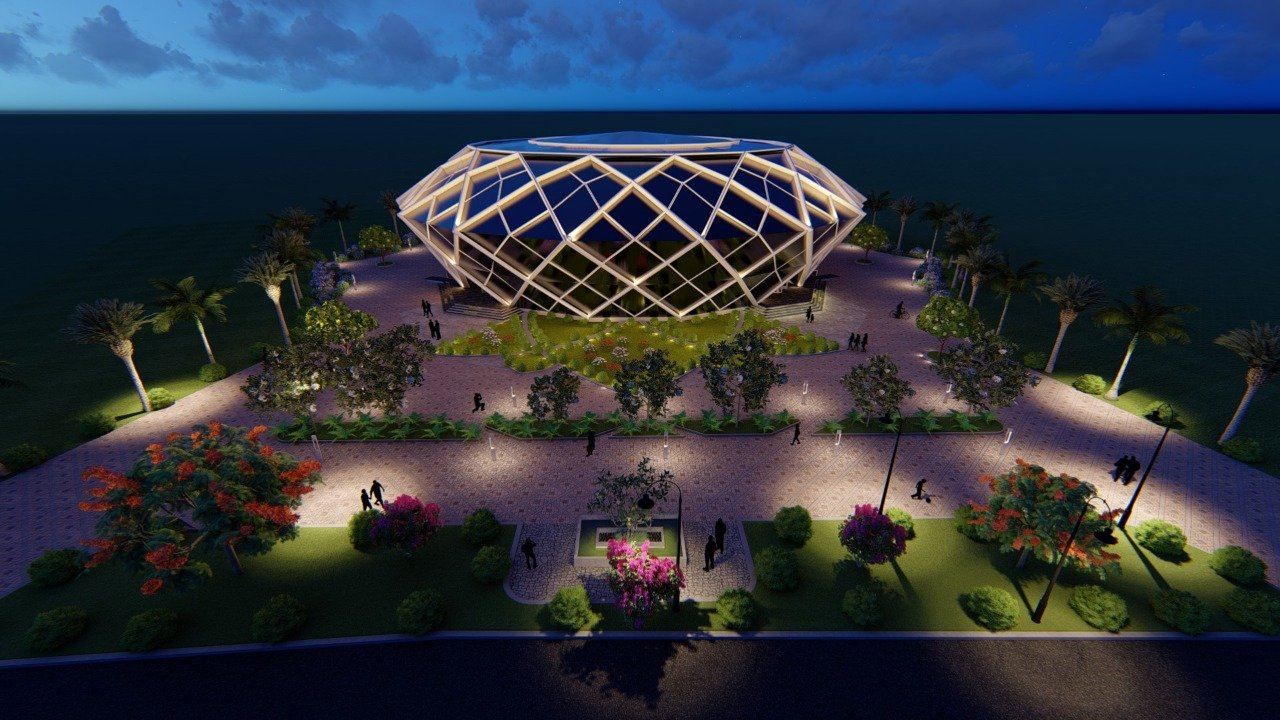
Architectural rendering of the proposed exterior of the Black Diamond Museum & Library, Angul (pre-construction design)

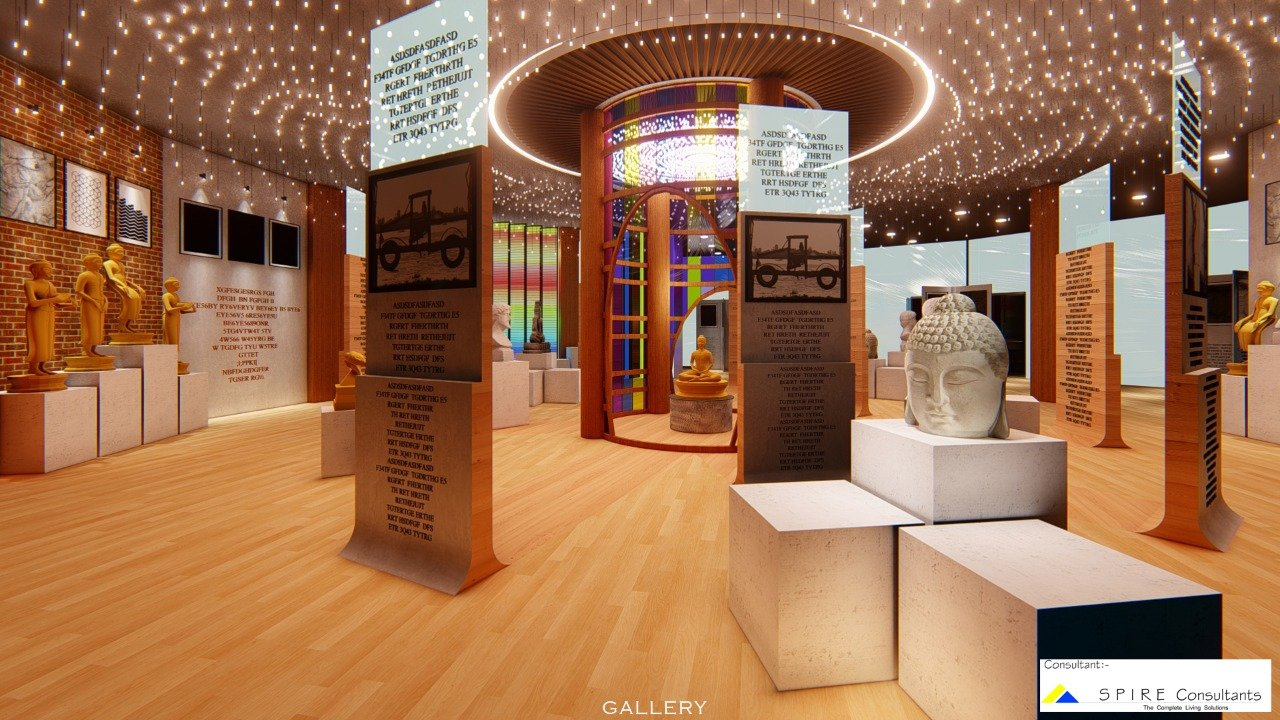
Architectural rendering of the proposed interior of the Black Diamond Museum & Library, Angul (pre-construction design)

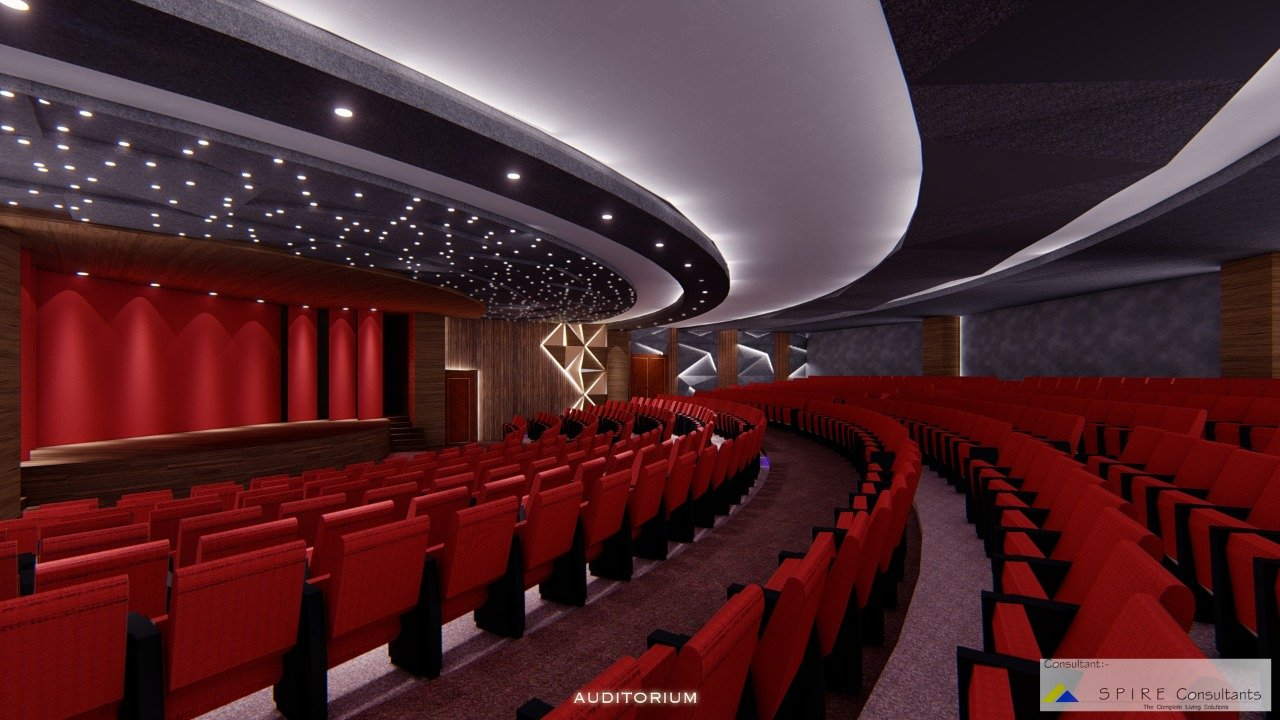
Architectural rendering of the proposed auditorium hall of the Black Diamond Museum & Library, Angul (pre-construction design)

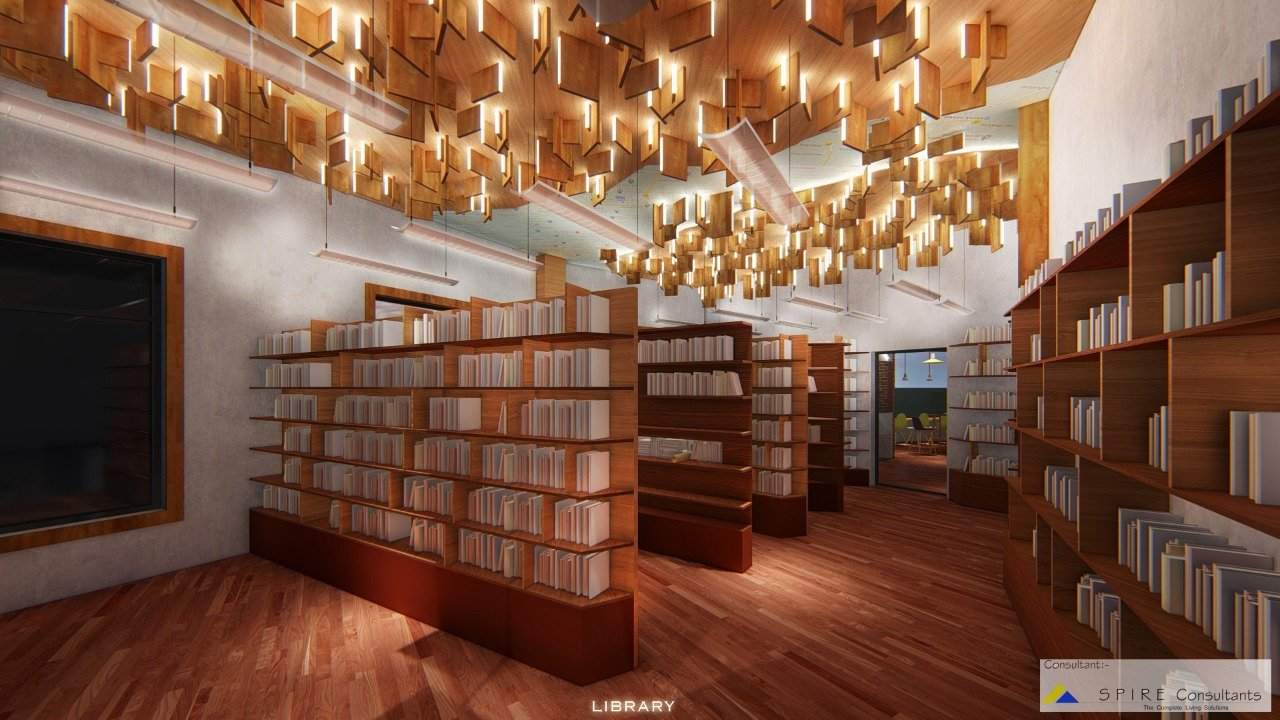
Architectural rendering of the proposed library of the Black Diamond Museum & Library, Angul (pre-construction design)

The Odisha government partnered with Mahanadi Coalfields Limited (MCL) to construct the museum, with a ₹25 crore budget, which was entirely funded by MCL. The complex is a three-storey building incorporating the museum, library, and other facilities.

=== Inauguration ===
Construction was completed in late 2023, 35 months after the announcement. The complex was inaugurated on 1 January 2024 by the District Magistrate of Angul, Siddharth Shankar Swain, and opened to the public thereafter.

== Location ==
Location of Black Diamond Complex in Angul district map

Location of Black Diamond Complex in Odisha map

Black Diamond Complex along NH-55

The Black Diamond Complex is located in central Angul on NH-55 (Cuttack–Sambalpur Highway). It adjoins the district Vigilance Office and lies near the Hulurisingha and Hemsurpada intersections.

== Visitor information ==
=== Timing ===
The complex is open daily from 9:00 AM to 5:00 PM, except Thursdays, when it remains closed for routine maintenance.

=== Access ===
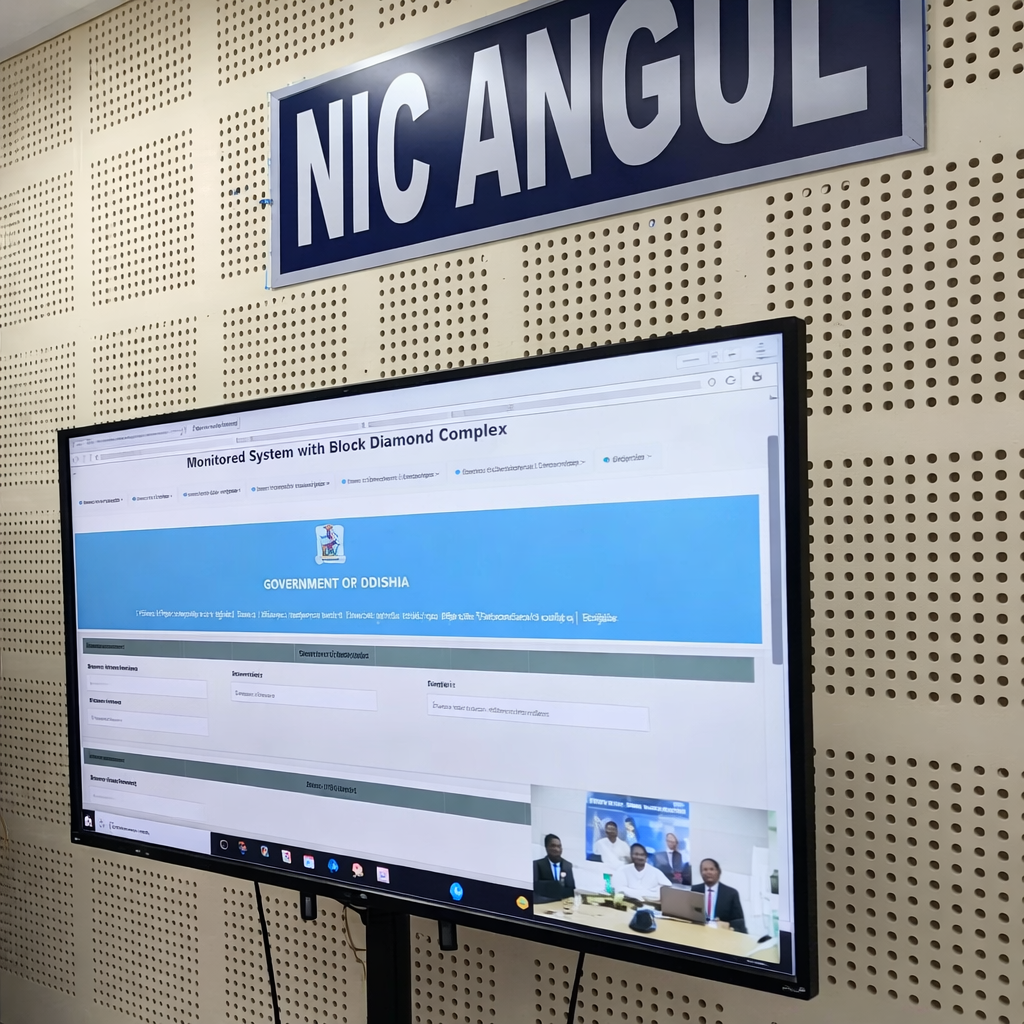
The ServicePlus-based digital ticketing system interface for the Black Diamond Complex.

The Black Diamond Complex uses both online and offline systems for visitor entry. Online reservations are serviceable through Odisha NIC ServicePlus portal.

The fee structure is categorized based on the specific facility utilized, such as general museum entry, library access, or auditorium usage. The following entry fees have been reported:

Category	Entry fee (INR)
General entry (museum)	₹10
General entry with library access	₹20
Entry with interpretive centre	₹30

Entry is free for children under the age of seven. Local residents displaced by coal mining projects in the region are also granted free entry.

== Gallery ==
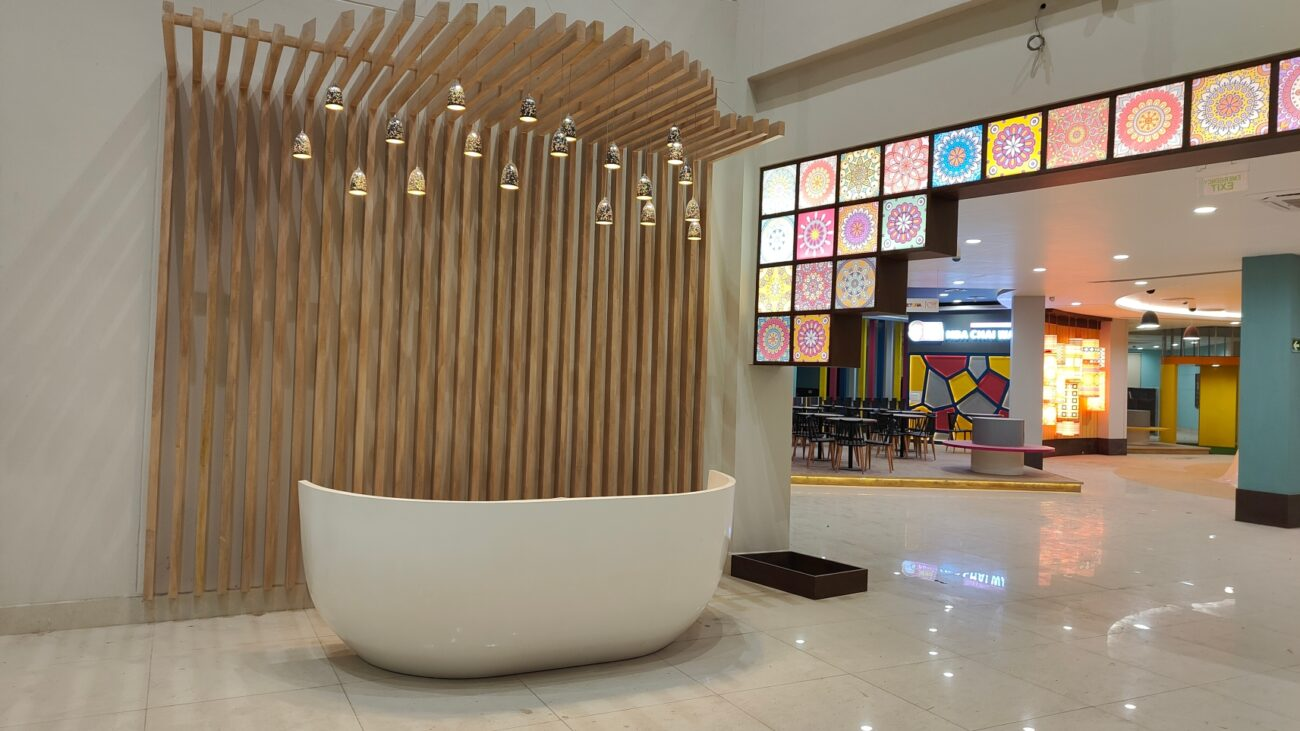
Interior entrance lobby with decorative wooden installation and lighting.

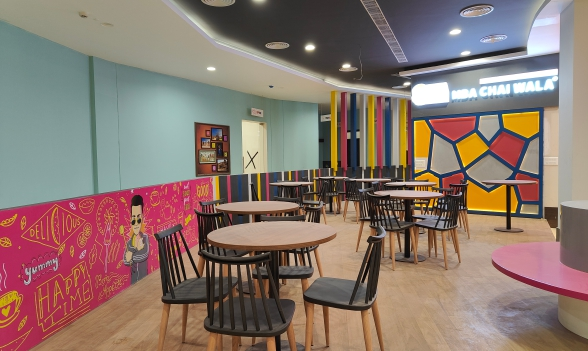
Seating and informal reading area inside the museum.

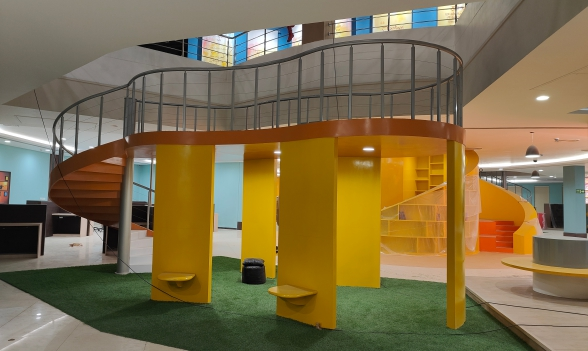
Central architectural installation with spiral staircase inside the museum.

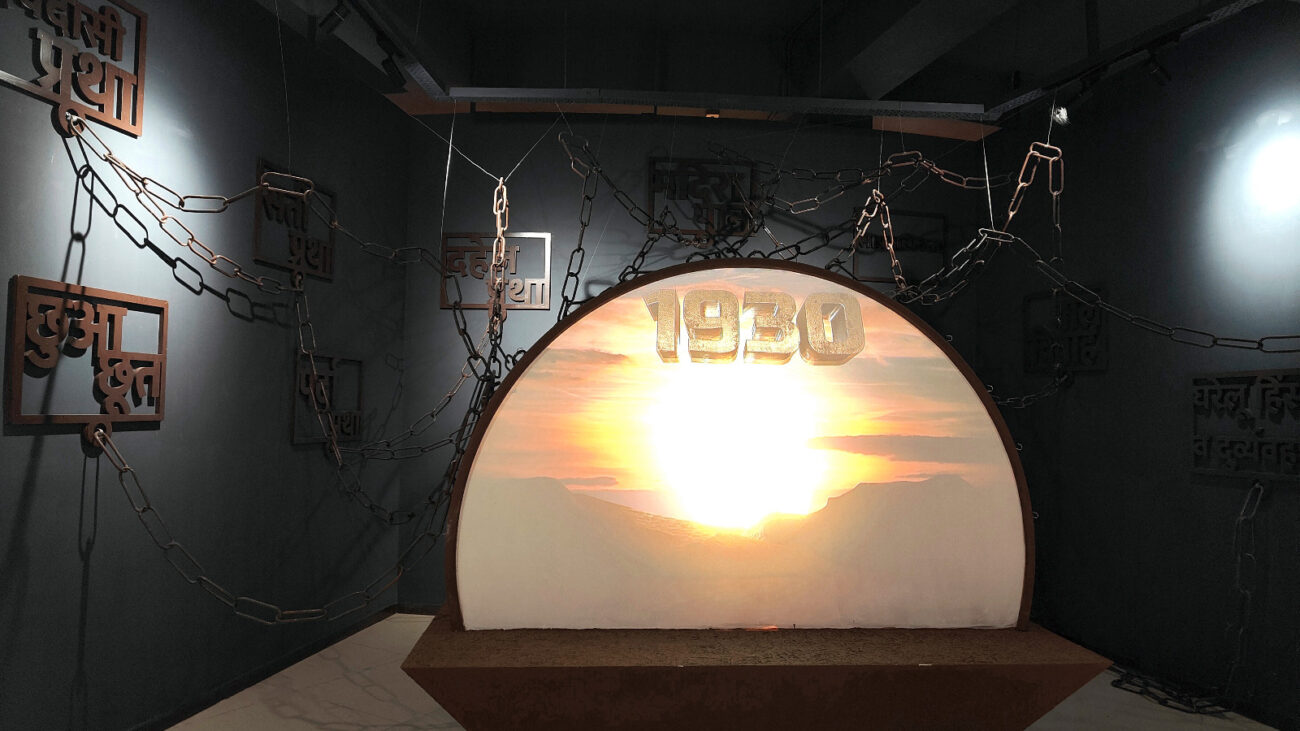
Thematic exhibition section depicting the year 1930.

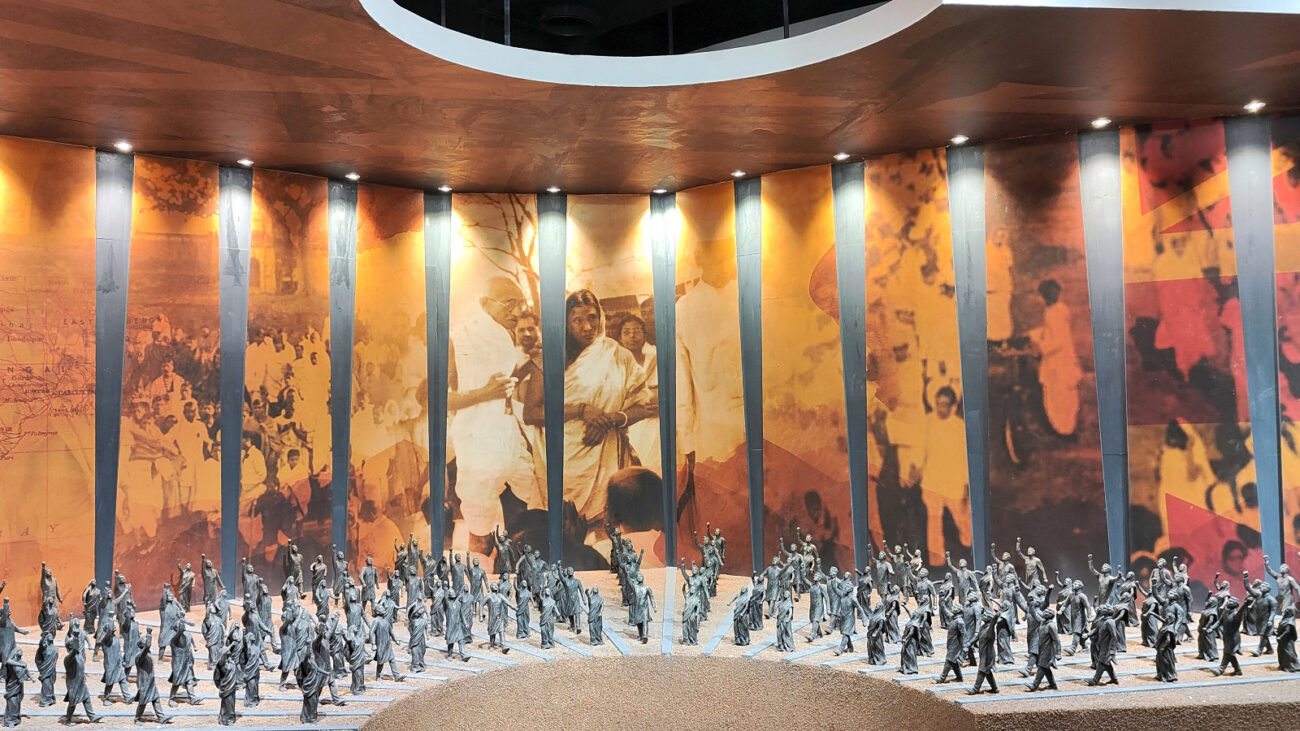
Sculptural installation representing scenes from the Indian independence movement.

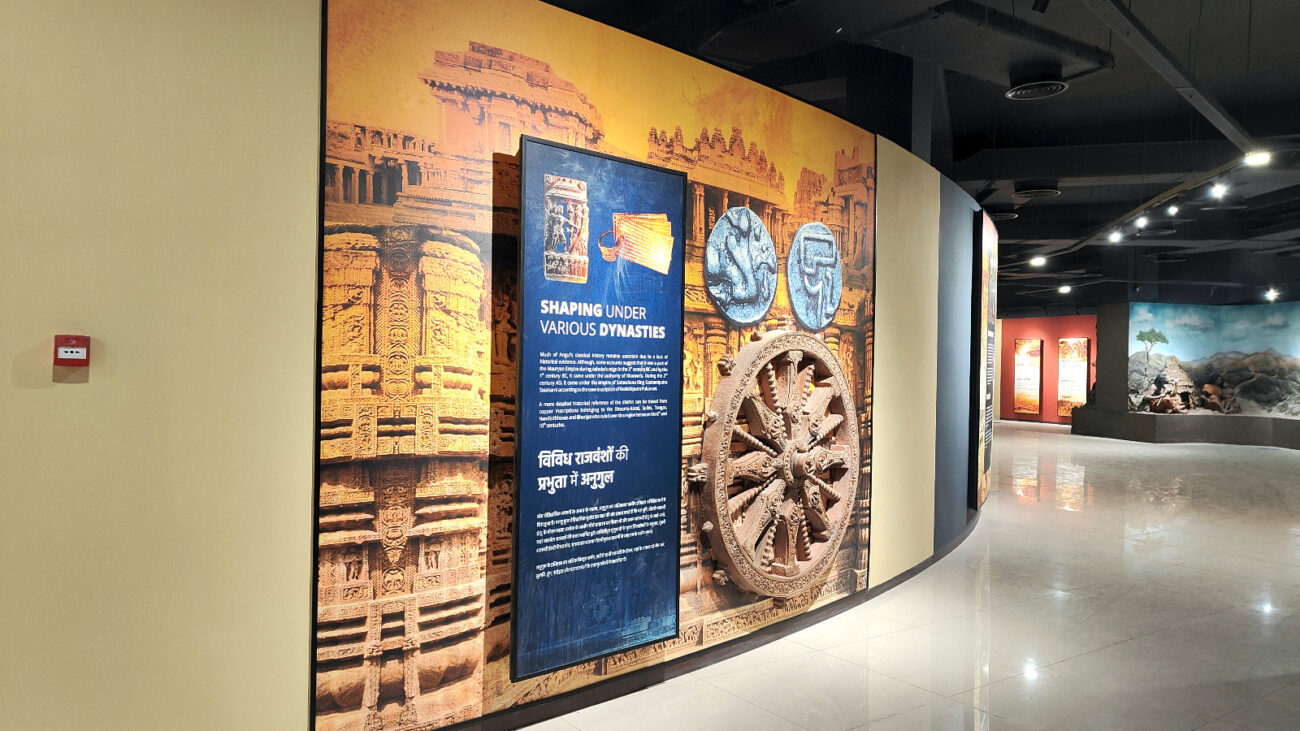
Exhibition gallery showcasing historical artifacts and panels.

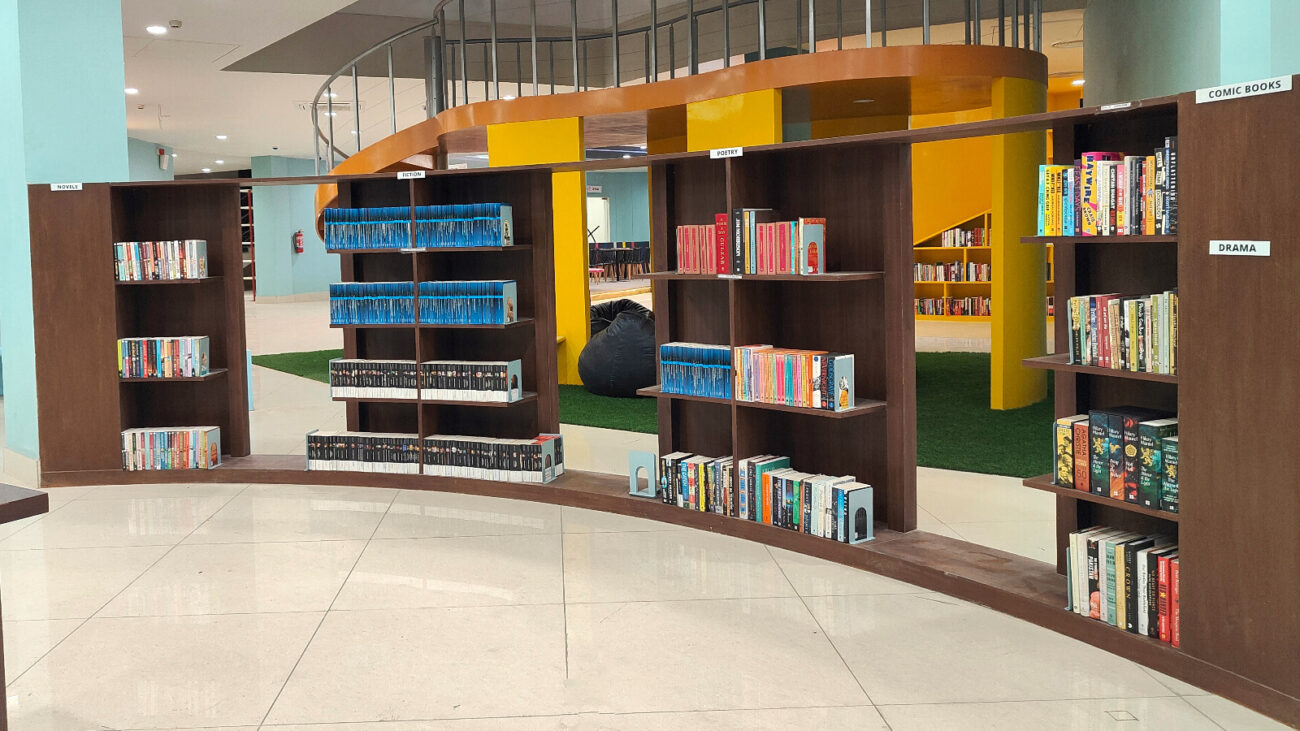
Library section with categorized bookshelves.

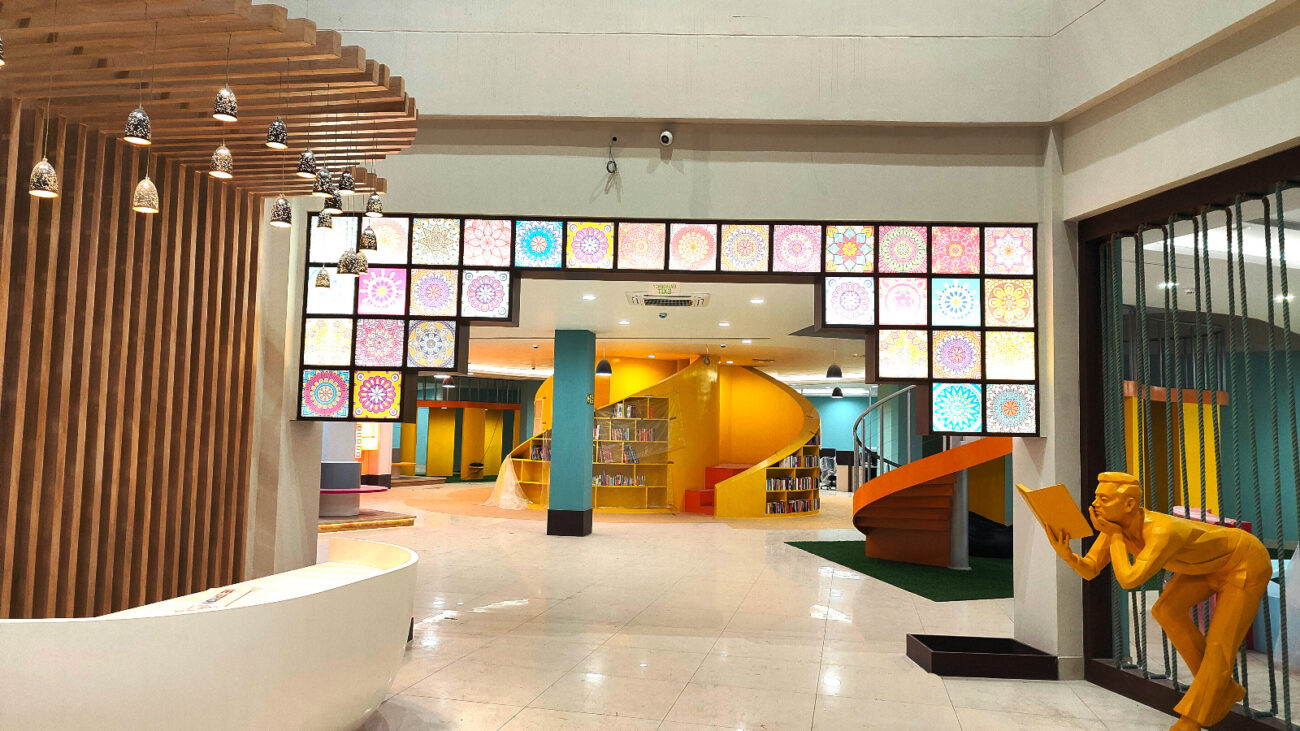
Decorative interior archway with colorful patterns.

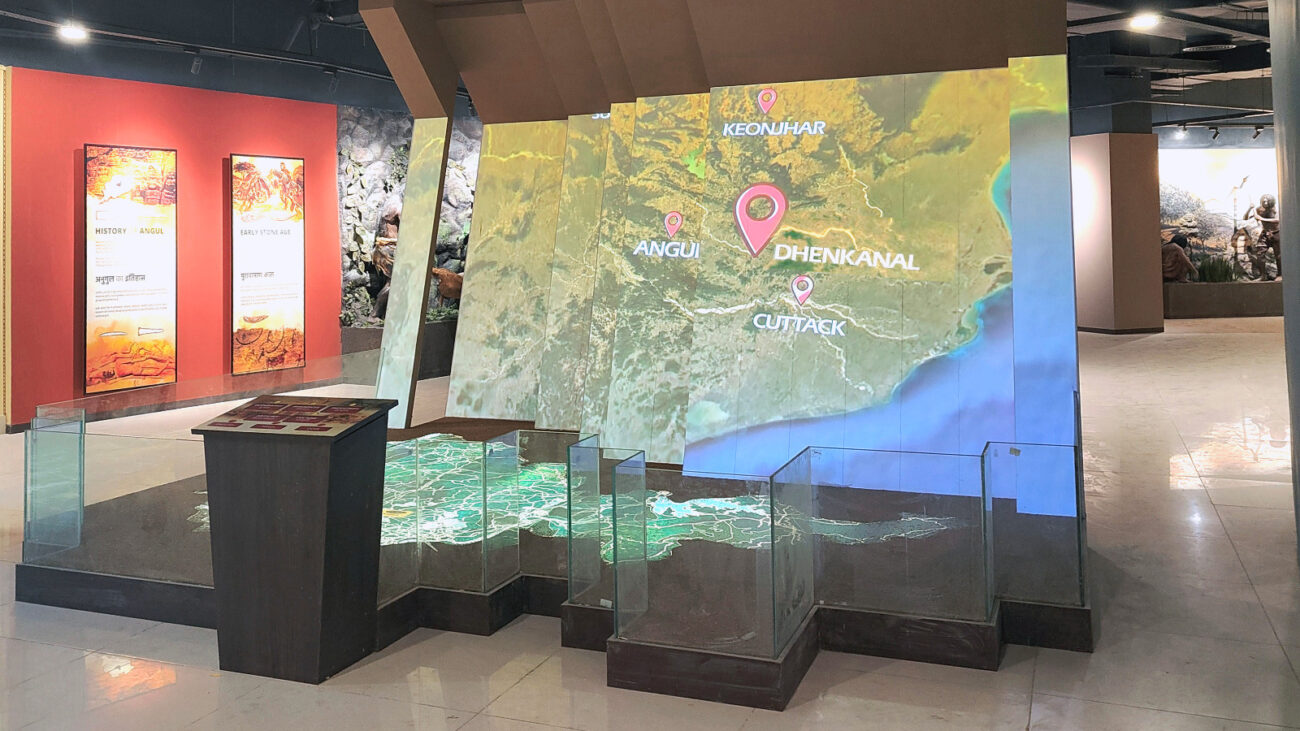
Interactive display showing regional geography.

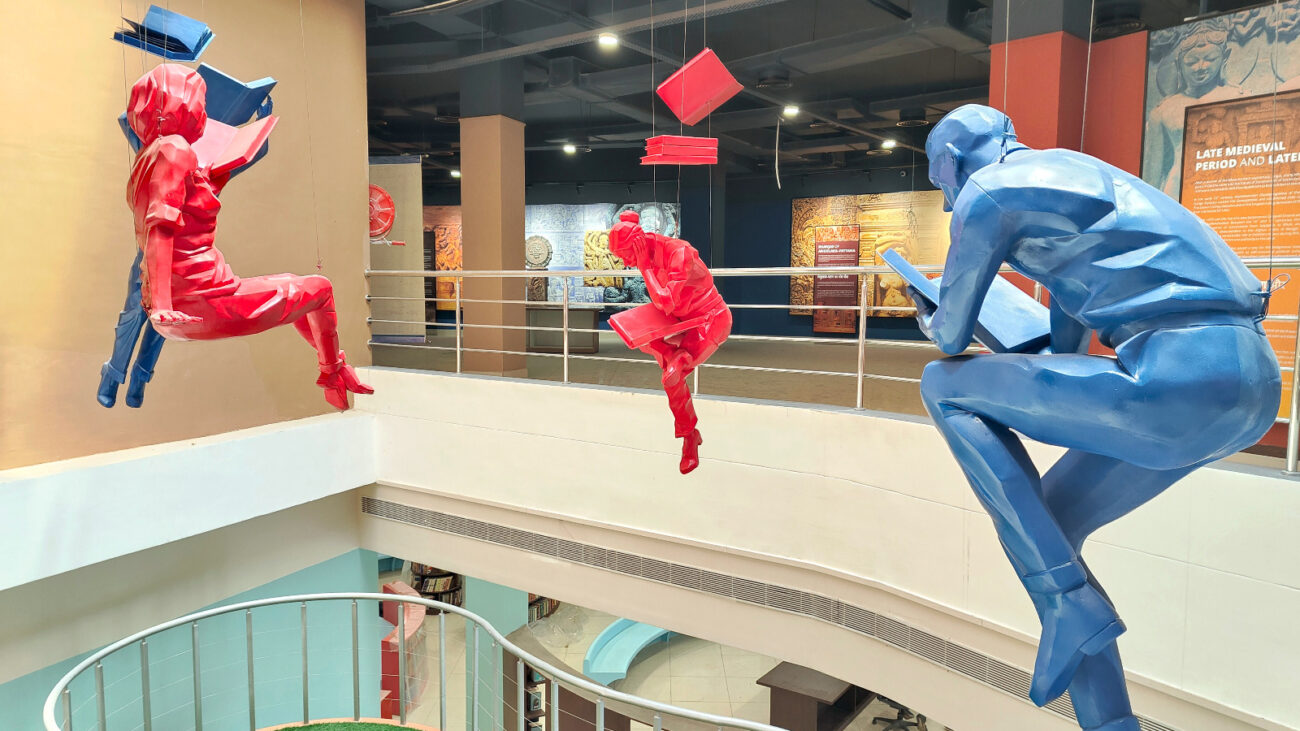
Contemporary hanging sculptures depicting readers.

== Reception ==
Media coverage of the Black Diamond Museum & Library has focused on its role as a digital initiative centred on coal mining and regional heritage in Angul. Reports have highlighted its aim to present information on coal formation, mining processes, and the history of coal extraction in the Talcher coalfields.

Some reports have also described the project as a “digital” or “fully digitalised” museum, noting the use of technology-driven exhibits to explain aspects of coal and its industrial significance.

=== Irregularities allegations ===
Some media reports have raised concerns regarding the project’s administration and transparency. A report by Argus News cited a Right to Information (RTI) application seeking details about the project’s budget allocation, and reported claims of delays in responses. The report also included statements from local political figure Pratap Chandra Pradhan, who questioned aspects of the project.

== See also ==
- Talcher Coalfield
- Mahanadi Coalfields Limited
- Coal mining in India
- List of museums in India
- List of Museums in Odisha
