= Ib Valley Coalfield =

Coal mine in Odisha, India

- Location in Odisha Ib Valley Coalfield (India)
- Location: Odisha, India; 21°51′N 83°56′E
- Company: Mahanadi Coalfields Limited
- Website: https://www.mahanadicoal.in/
- Acquired: 1992

Ib Valley Coalfield is located in Jharsuguda district in the Indian state of Odisha, in the valley of the Ib River, a tributary of the Mahanadi. ′

== History ==
In 1900, when Bengal Nagpur Railway was building a bridge across the Ib River, coal was accidentally discovered. The first coalmine in the Ib Valley Coalfield was established by Himgir Rampur Coal Company in 1909. Other underground collieries were opened by private operators till nationalization of the coal industry in 1973, when it was placed under Western Coalfields Limited. In 1986, it came under South Eastern Coalfields Limited and in 1992 under Mahanadi Coalfields Limited. With nationalization came the age of open cast mines. Ib Valley Coalfield operates three major open cast mines – Lajkura Opencast Mine, Samleswari Opencast Mine and Lilari Opencast Mine. Production of the field has risen sharply from 0.55 million tonnes in 1972–73 to 15.51 million tonnes in 2002–2003.

== The coalfield ==
Ib Valley Coalfield lies between latitudes 21° 41′N and 22° 06′N and longitudes 83° 30′E and 84° 08′E . It covers an area of 1,375 square kilometres (531 sq mi).

According to Geological Survey of India, the Talcher Coalfield has reserves of 38.65 billion tonnes, the highest in India. Ib Valley Coalfield has reserves of 22.3 billion tonnes, the third highest in India.

This coalfield forms part of the large Gondwana basin that extends across several districts in adjoining Chhattisgarh.

== Transport ==
Ib Valley Coalfield is served by South East Central Railway. The main railway station for passenger traffic is Brajrajnagar on the Tatanagar–Bilaspur section of Howrah–Nagpur–Mumbai line. The area links to NH 200.

Construction of the 52 km (32 mi)-long Jharsuguda–Barpalli rail line is essential for transportation of coal from the Ib Valley Coalfield with a potential of 90 million tonnes per annum. Mahanadi Coalfields Limited will fund this project.
