= Bandhabahal =

Town in Jharsuguda, Odisha, India

Coordinates: 21.753153°N 83.870888°E

Bandhabahal is a small town in the Jharsuguda district in Odisha, India. It has a number of coal mines, which come under Mahanadi Coalfields Limited (M.C.L).

== Economy ==
- Mahanadi Coalfields Limited (M.C.L)

=== Source of income ===
Most of the people work in coal mines. Some people are farmers and some are having their own businesses such as shops, suppliers, dealers, and retailers.

- Coal Transportation

Mostly Heavy Vehicles are used to transport coal from mines to other places.

- Maa Samalei Truck Owners Association widely known as MSTOA and Bandhabahal Truck and Tipper Owners Association is engaged for helping transporters in LKP, BOCM, LILARI Opencast mines in transportation of coals to local and other placesAttractions
- Jagannath Temple
- Open Cast Coal Mines
- Ratha Yatra
- BIG Dumpher Section
- EMCL Coal WashSambalpur University & IIM S bmlpur a a
- a

=== Nearest tourist interests ===
- Odisha 2nd Highest Jagannath Temple Bandhabahal
- Koilighughar waterfall (Lakhanpur)
- Historical Kolabira Fort
- The Airport established during the World War 2
- Kali Mandir, K.M.Road, Jharsuguda
- JRD TATA Park, Belpahar, Jharsuguda
- Lal Patthar, Belpahar
- Temple Courtyard and sculptures
- Golf ground, bandhabahal
- CHANDI MANDIR, BRAJRAJNAGAR

== Festivals ==
- Dhanu Jatra
- Danda Nacha
- Rath Yatra
- Ganesh Puja
- Vishwakarma Puja
- Durga Puja
- Chhath Puja

== Education ==
- Schools
  - Bandhabahal P.U.P. School
  - DAV Public School
  - Bandhabahal High School
  - Bandhabahal UP School
  - Saraswati Sishu Mandir

== Police outpost ==
- Bandhabahal Police Out Post

== Transport ==
- By Road this place is well connected with all major towns in Odisha
- The Nearest Railway Station is Belpahar.
- The Nearest Airport is Bhubaneswar now Jharsuguda.

=== Distance from places ===
- Belpahar - 11 km
- Brajrajnagar - 18 km
- Jharsuguda - 35 km
- Sundargarh - 64 km
- Sambalpur - 80.3 km
- Bhubaneswer - 400 km
- IB Thermal-07 km
