= Museum of Justice, Orissa High Court =

Museum dedicated to the journey of judiciary in India

Coordinates: 20.4856°N 85.8637°E

Museum of Justice, Orissa High Court is the museum dedicated to the journey of judiciary in Odisha from past to present. The museum houses various objects on Indian legal system starting from British Raj. The museum showcases the evolution of legal system in Odisha.

== History ==
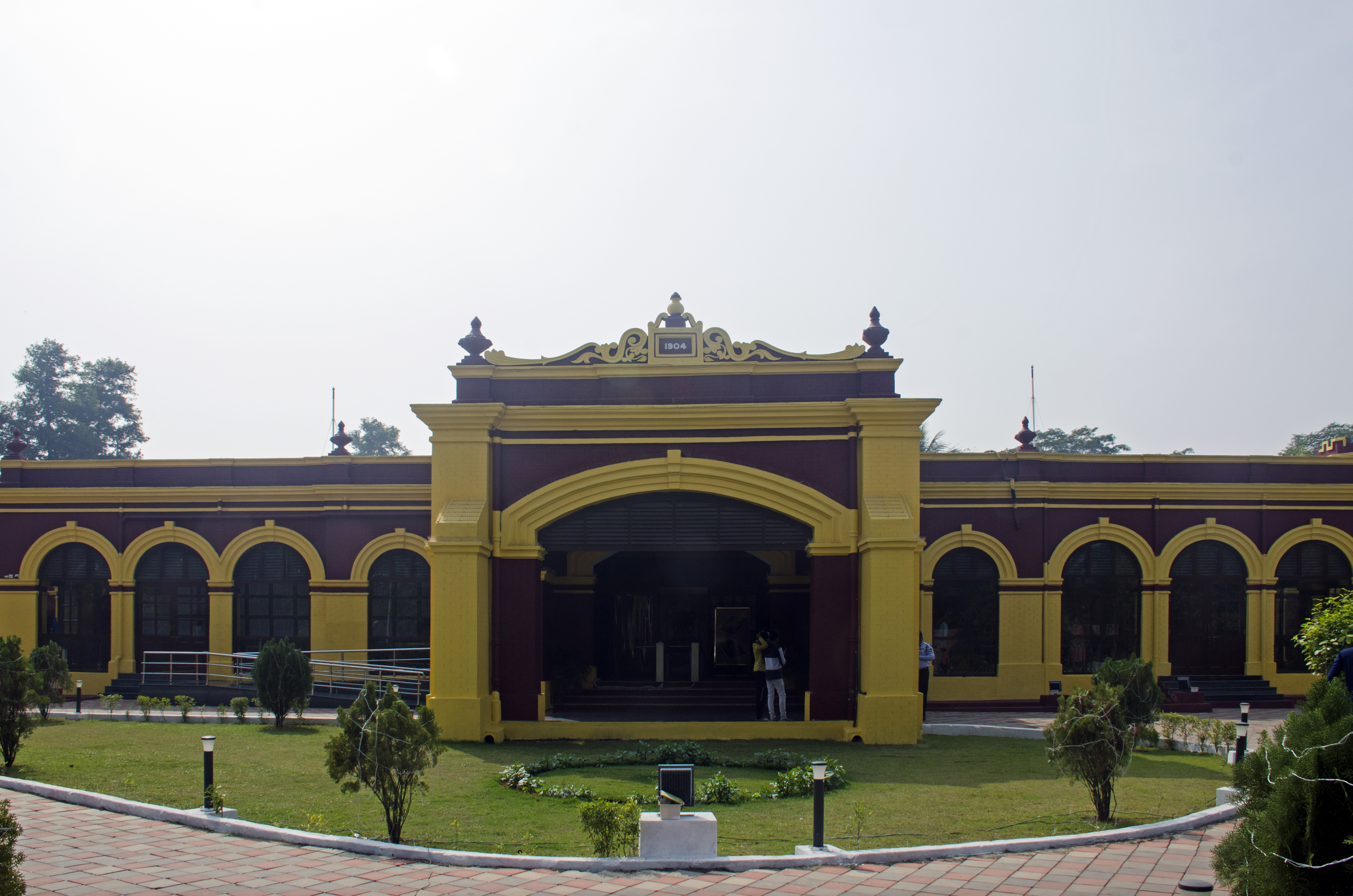
Museum of Justice, Cuttack

The idea of refurbishing the museum was of Dr. S. Muralidhar, Chief Justice Of Orissa High Court (2023). Under the aegis of Dr. S. Muralidhar, Chief justice of Orissa High Court, the museum was refurbished and re-inaugurated by Prof. Ganeshilal, Governor of Odisha on 25 February 2023. The museum is having around 1500 items in 2023. The museum houses various typical articles. Many files, photographs associated with the trial and conviction of the freedom fighters of Odisha are also a part of the museum. The theme pavilion of the museum contains a digital timeline of Orissa High Court along with a photograph and graphic model of the court and its development since inception. Gallery no.1 of the Museum contains database on the evolution of justice system in Odisha and in the Gallery no.2 there are various presentations relating to the Indian Freedom struggle.

“It is the eighth wonder of the world for me at least. The country will be proud while going around it”. Prof. Ganeshi Lal said while inaugurating the museum.

The museum is located at Quila Fort, Cuttack inside the historic compound of Barabati Quila (fort), Cuttack.

== Exhibitions ==
Some notable items include:

- select list of eminent lawyers of Odisha
- Laxman Nayak conviction case
- Mock Court
- Photographs of all ex chief justices
- old court apparels and accessories like wigs and judges’ wig stand

== Official website ==
- Orissa High Court

== See also ==
- List of Museums in Odisha
