= Odisha Crafts Museum =

Odisha Crafts Museum - Kala Bhoomi
- ଓଡ଼ିଶା ହସ୍ତଶିଳ୍ପ ସଂଗ୍ରହାଳୟ
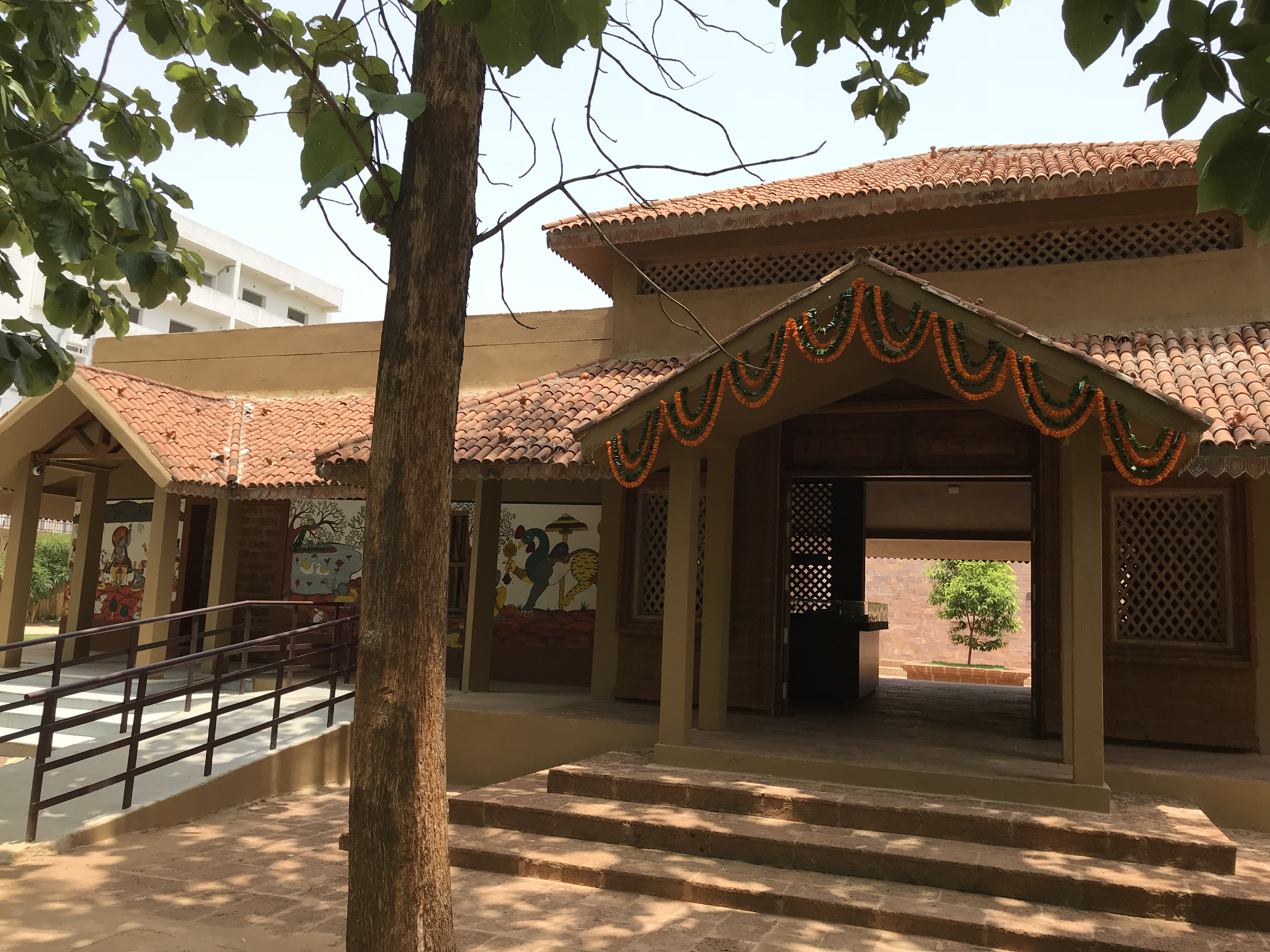
- Entrance gate of Odisha Crafts Museum - Kala Bhoomi
- Established: 2018
- Location: Silpi Vihar, Pokhriput, Bhubaneswar, India
- Coordinates: 20.2516°N 85.8068°E
- Owner: Government of Odisha
- Website: www.odishacraftsmuseum.com

Odisha Crafts Museum also known as Kalabhoomi designed by Architects' Studio, is a museum in Bhubaneswar, Odisha, India, dedicated to the art and crafts of Odisha. It was inaugurated by the Chief Minister of Odisha, Naveen Patnaik, on 22 March 2018. The museum is spread across 12.68 Acres of an area, divided into eight galleries, Open air amphitheater, workshop area and souvenir shop.

The museum celebrates the craftsmanship of Odia artisans by putting on display their breath-taking masterpieces. Divided into 2 blocks, the museum has a display area and a live section. The display area focuses on galleries about Handicrafts and Handlooms from around the state while the live section is equipped with an open air theatre as well as separate workshop zones. Kala Bhoomi is built using local raw materials such as the laterite stone which can still be seen in some of the oldest monuments around the state. At Kala Bhoomi we have 10 galleries out of which 9 are open to the public. There are two blocks. The Handicrafts block contains Terracotta, Traditional Paintings, Stone and Wood Carving and Natural Material crafts galleries on the other hand the Handloom block displayed the Pre-Weaving Techniques, Tribal Crafts, The Crafts of Shree Jagannath Culture and Handloom galleries which represents the unique and antique raw materials and equipment as well as variety of Handlooms from across the state.

== Galleries ==
1. Terracotta
2. Traditional Paintings
3. Stone and Wood Carving
4. Metal Crafts
5. Natural Crafts
6. Pre-weaving techniques
7. Tribal Crafts
8. Crafts of Shree Jagannath Culture
9. Handloom Gallery

There is one more gallery dedicated to the Dance Forms of Odisha that currently under construction.

== Timings ==
Opening timing is 10:00 AM to 5:30 PM all days of the week. It is closed on select National Holidays such as Independence Day, Deepawali/ Kali Puja, etc. The website contains list of approved holidays.

== Gallery ==
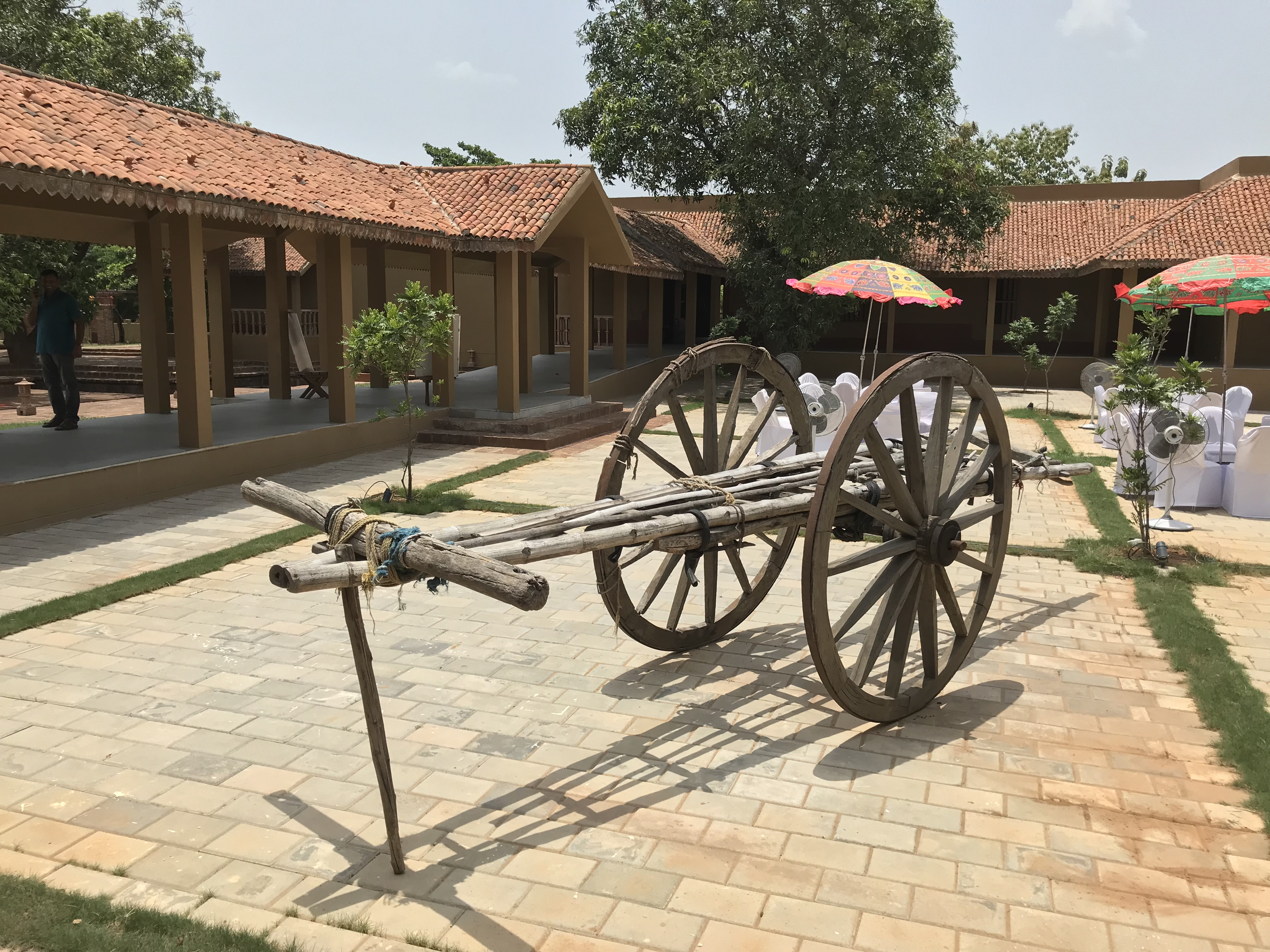
Traditional Bullock cart

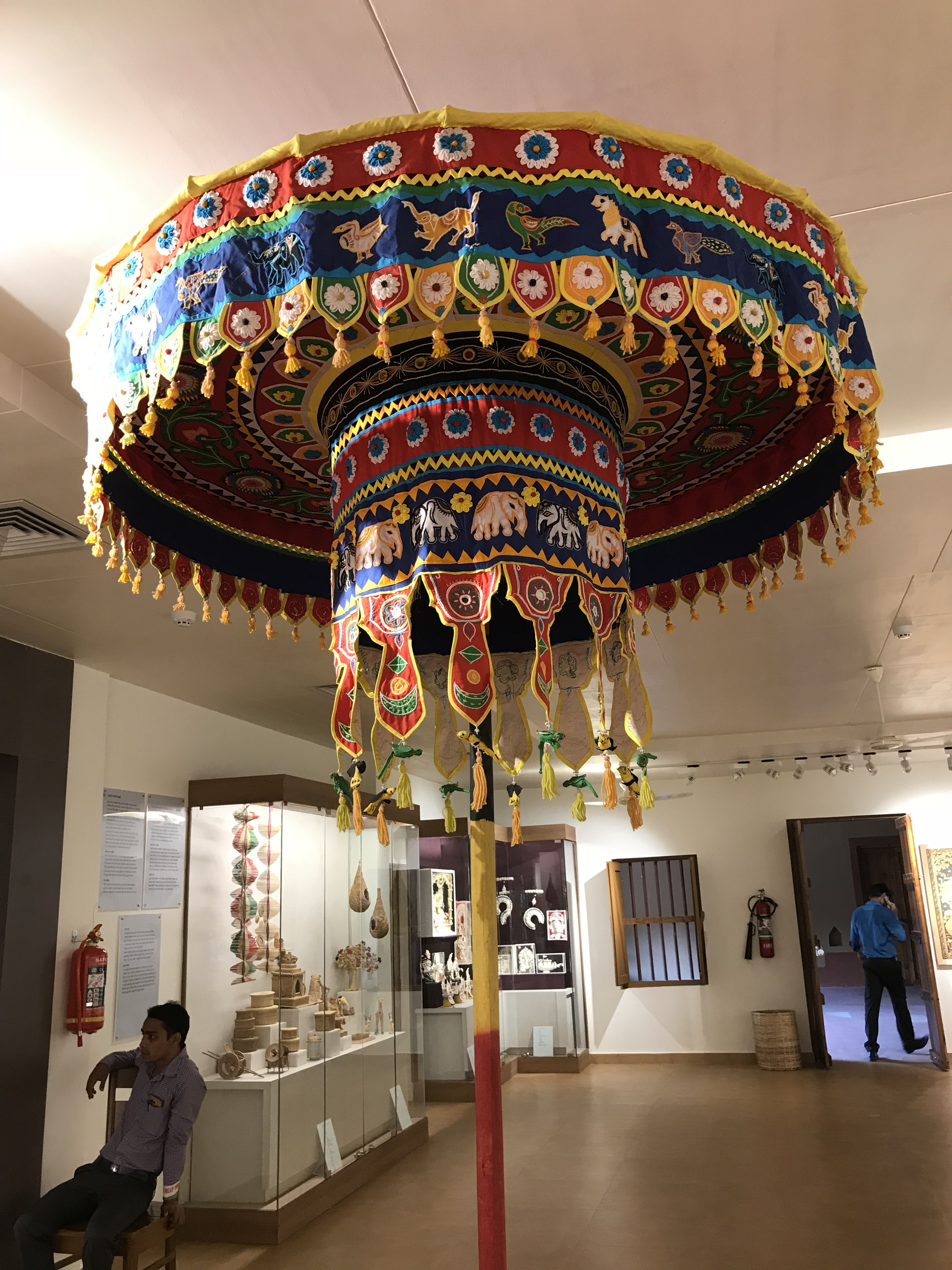
Pipili applique work

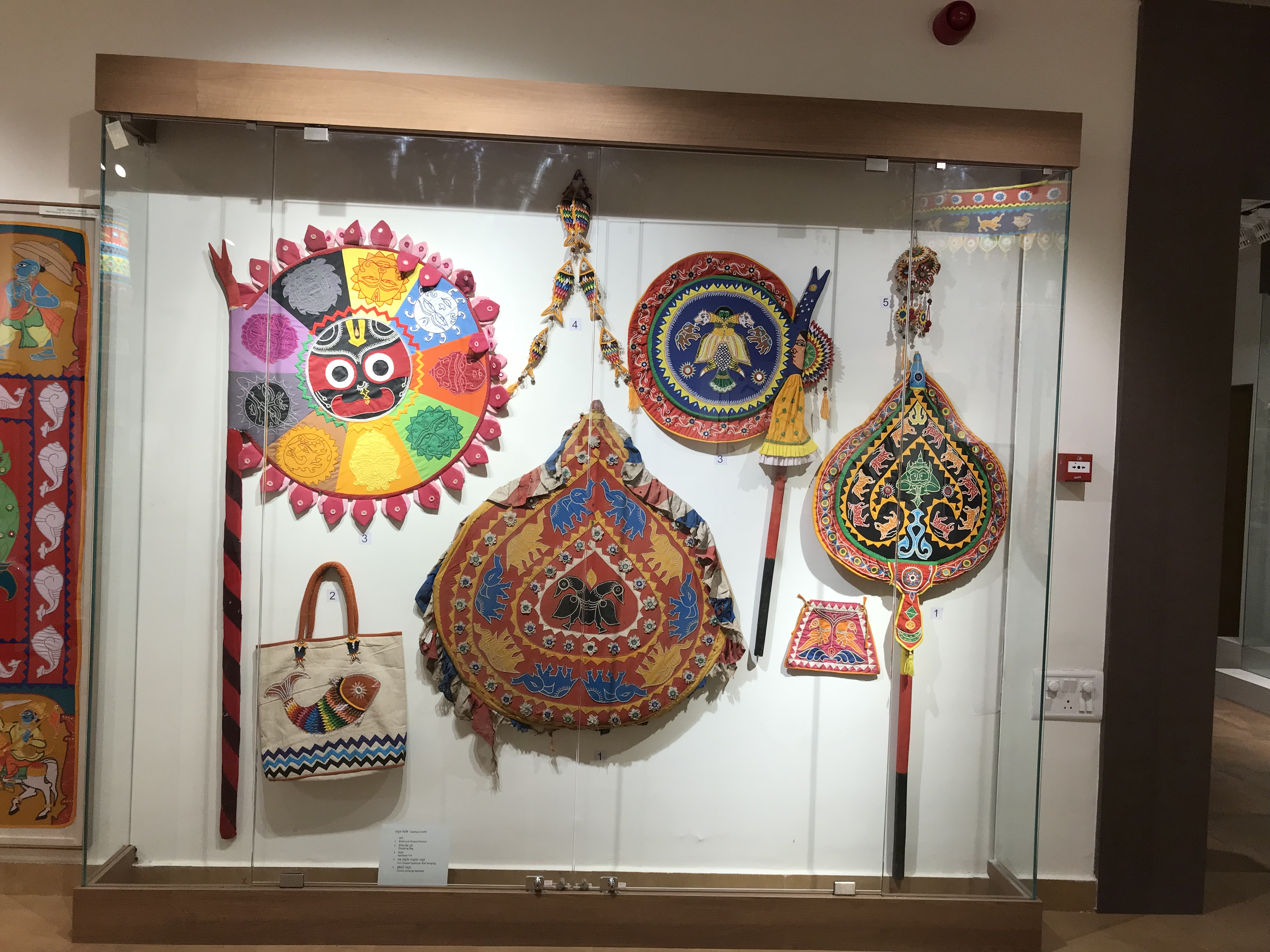
Pipili applique work

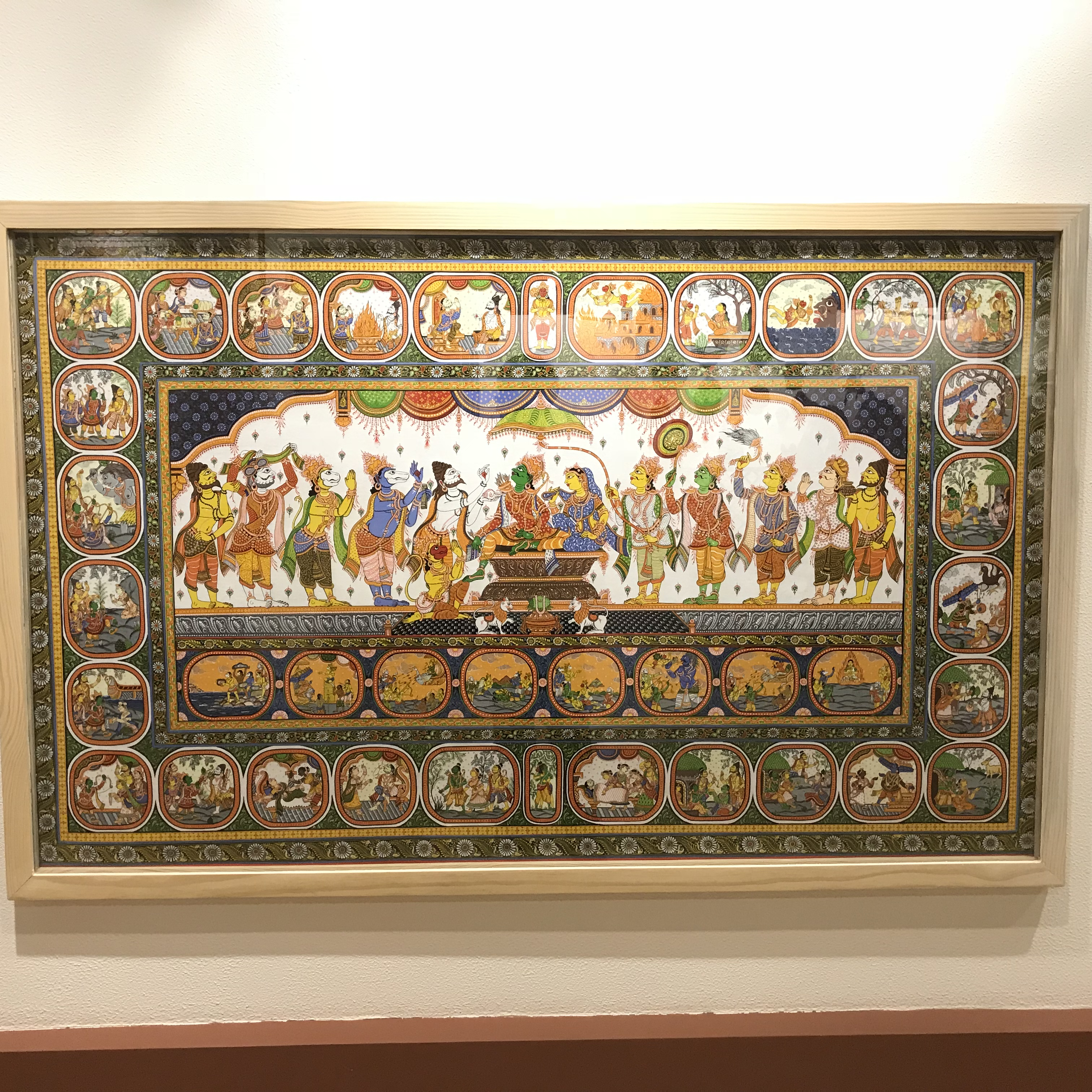
Pattachitra

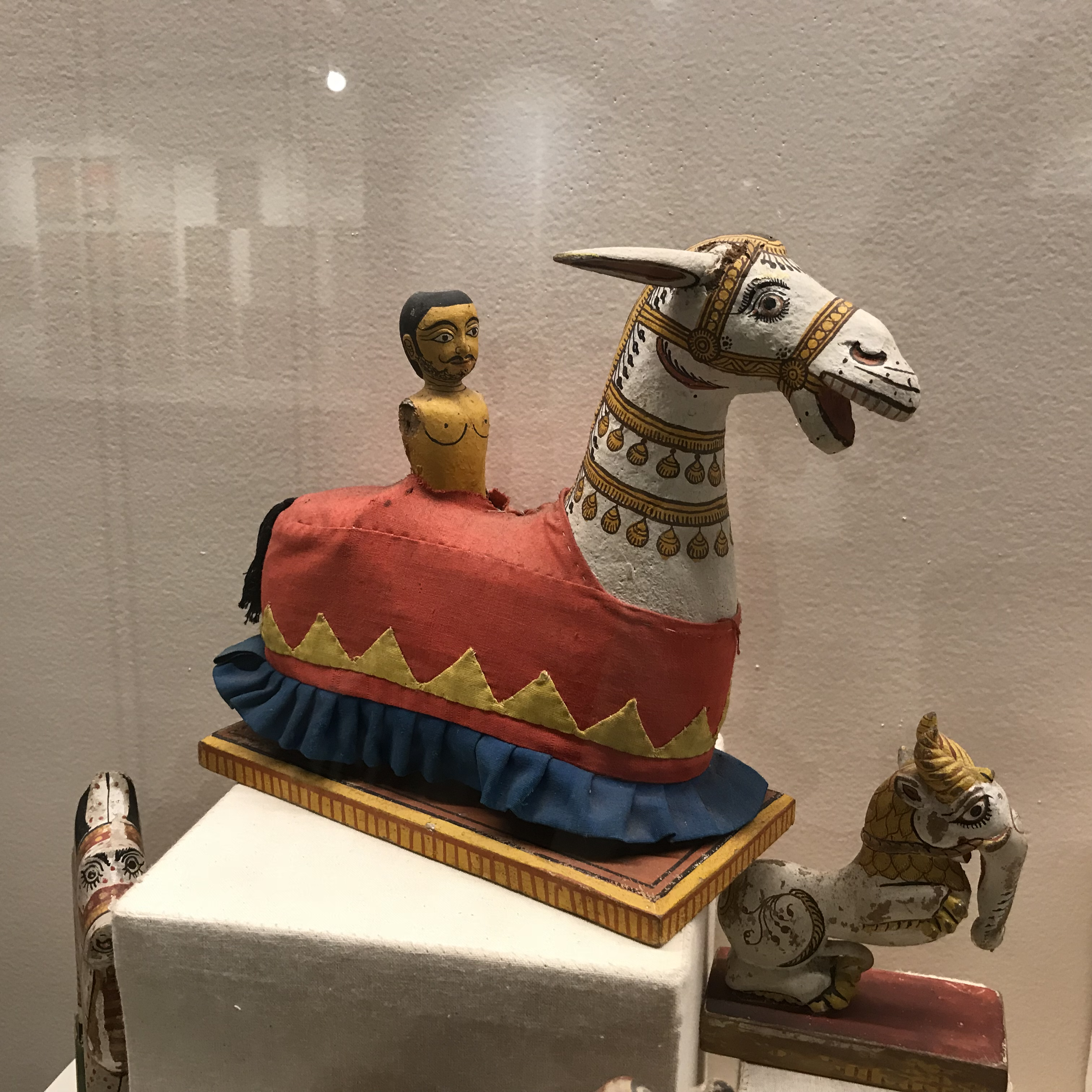
Ghoda Nacha Toy

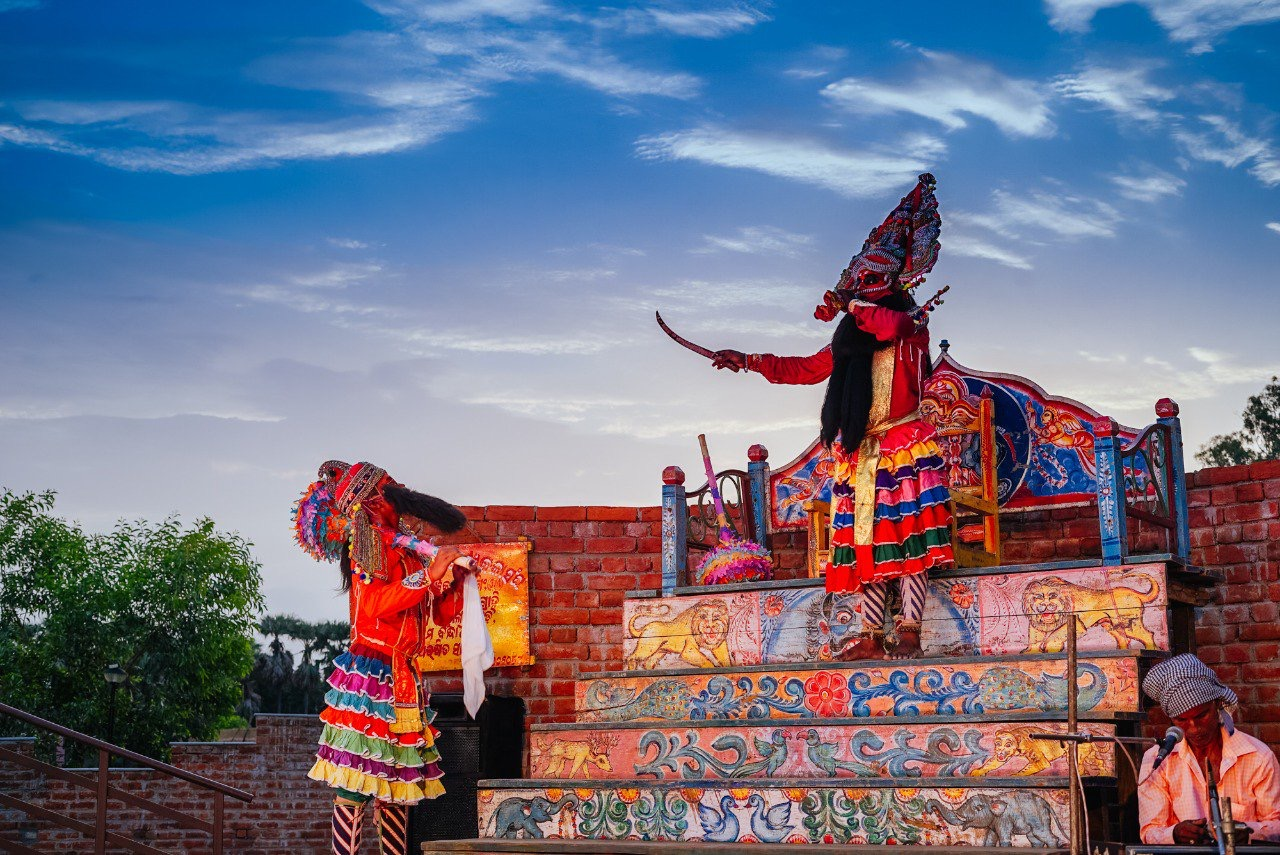
Prahlada Nataka performance at Crafts Museum

== See also ==
- List of Museums in Odisha
