= Tribal Museum Rourkela =

Tribal Museum in Rourkela, Odisha

Tribal Research and Cultural Museum, Rourkela
- ରାଉରକେଲା ଆଦିବାସୀ ଗବେଷଣା ଓ ସାଂସ୍କୃତିକ ସଂଗ୍ରହାଳୟ
- Location in Odisha Location in India
- Established: April 2026
- Location: Rourkela, Odisha, India
- Coordinates: 22.2604°N 84.8536°E
- Type: Tribal museum
- Owner: Government of Odisha

The Tribal Research and Cultural Museum (Odia: ରାଉରକେଲା ଆଦିବାସୀ ଗବେଷଣା ଓ ସାଂସ୍କୃତିକ ସଂଗ୍ରହାଳୟ; Oriya: Rāurakelā ādibāsī gabēṣaṇā o sāṁskr̥tika saṅgrahāḷaya), also referred to as the Tribal Museum, is a cultural museum located in Rourkela city in the state of Odisha. The museum is dedicated to the preservation, documentation, and exhibition of the state's cultural heritage of tribal communities. The Tribal Museum in Rourkela was conceptualized as part of broader efforts by the Government of Odisha to promote and preserve tribal heritage in the western region of the state. It was formally inaugurated in April 2026 during the official visit of President Droupadi Murmu to Rourkela.

The establishment of the museum reflects increasing institutional focus on tribal studies and cultural preservation, particularly in Odisha, which as a significant tribal population.

== See also ==
- Tribal Research Institute Museum
- Anthropology
- List of Museums in Odisha
