= List of museums in Odisha =

List of museums in Odisha provides a list of notable museums located in the Indian state of Odisha. These museums preserve and showcase the state's rich cultural heritage, tribal traditions, archaeological artifacts, art, and industrial history.

== Overview ==
Odisha hosts a variety of museums managed by the Government of Odisha, private institutions, and trusts. These museums cover diverse domains such as archaeology, anthropology, maritime history, tribal culture, and science.

== List of museums ==
Name	Location	Type	Establishment	Description
Black Diamond Museum	Angul	Industrial / Cultural	2023	A digital museum and library focusing on the history, technology, and heritage of coal mining in the Talcher coalfields and Angul region.
Odisha State Museum	Bhubaneswar	Archaeology / History	1932	One of the oldest museums in the state, housing collections of palm-leaf manuscripts, sculptures, coins, and natural history exhibits.
Tribal Museum, Bhubaneswar	Bhubaneswar	Anthropology	1953	Also known as the Odisha State Tribal Museum, it showcases the lifestyle, culture, and artifacts of various tribal communities of Odisha.
Kala Bhoomi (Odisha Crafts Museum)	Bhubaneswar	Art / Crafts	2018	Dedicated to traditional crafts and artisans of Odisha, featuring live demonstrations and galleries.
Regional Museum of Natural History	Bhubaneswar	Natural History	2004	A museum focusing on biodiversity, environment, and conservation in eastern India.
Pathani Samanta Planetarium	Bhubaneswar	Science	1989	A planetarium offering educational programs related to astronomy and space science.
Netaji Birth Place Museum	Cuttack	History / Biography	1973	Located at the birthplace of Subhas Chandra Bose, showcasing his life and contributions.
Swaraj Ashram Museum	Cuttack	History	1971	A museum dedicated to India's freedom movement and associated leaders.
Maritime Museum	Cuttack	Maritime History	2013	Located near Jobra, it highlights Odisha's ancient maritime trade and naval history.
Sudarshan Crafts Museum	Puri	Art / Crafts	1977	Established by artist Sudarshan Sahoo, focusing on stone sculptures and traditional art.
Raghurajpur Crafts Village	Puri district	Folk Art	—	A heritage crafts village known for Pattachitra paintings and traditional arts.
Konark Interpretation Centre	Konark	Archaeology / Heritage	2017	Provides insights into the history and architecture of the Konark Sun Temple.
INS Chilika Naval Museum	Chilika	Military / Naval	—	A naval museum showcasing maritime defense history and naval artifacts.
Tribal Research and Cultural Museum	Rourkela	Anthropology	—	Focuses on tribal heritage and ethnographic collections of western Odisha.
Odisha Police Museum	Cuttack	Law Enforcement	2020	Exhibits the history and evolution of policing in Odisha.
Museum of Justice	Cuttack	Law Enforcement	2017	Showcases the evolution of legal system in Odisha.

== See also ==
- Tourism in Odisha
- Culture of Odisha
