= Odisha State Museum =

Museum in Bhubaneswar, India

- ଓଡ଼ିଶା ରାଜ୍ୟ ସଂଗ୍ରହାଳୟ
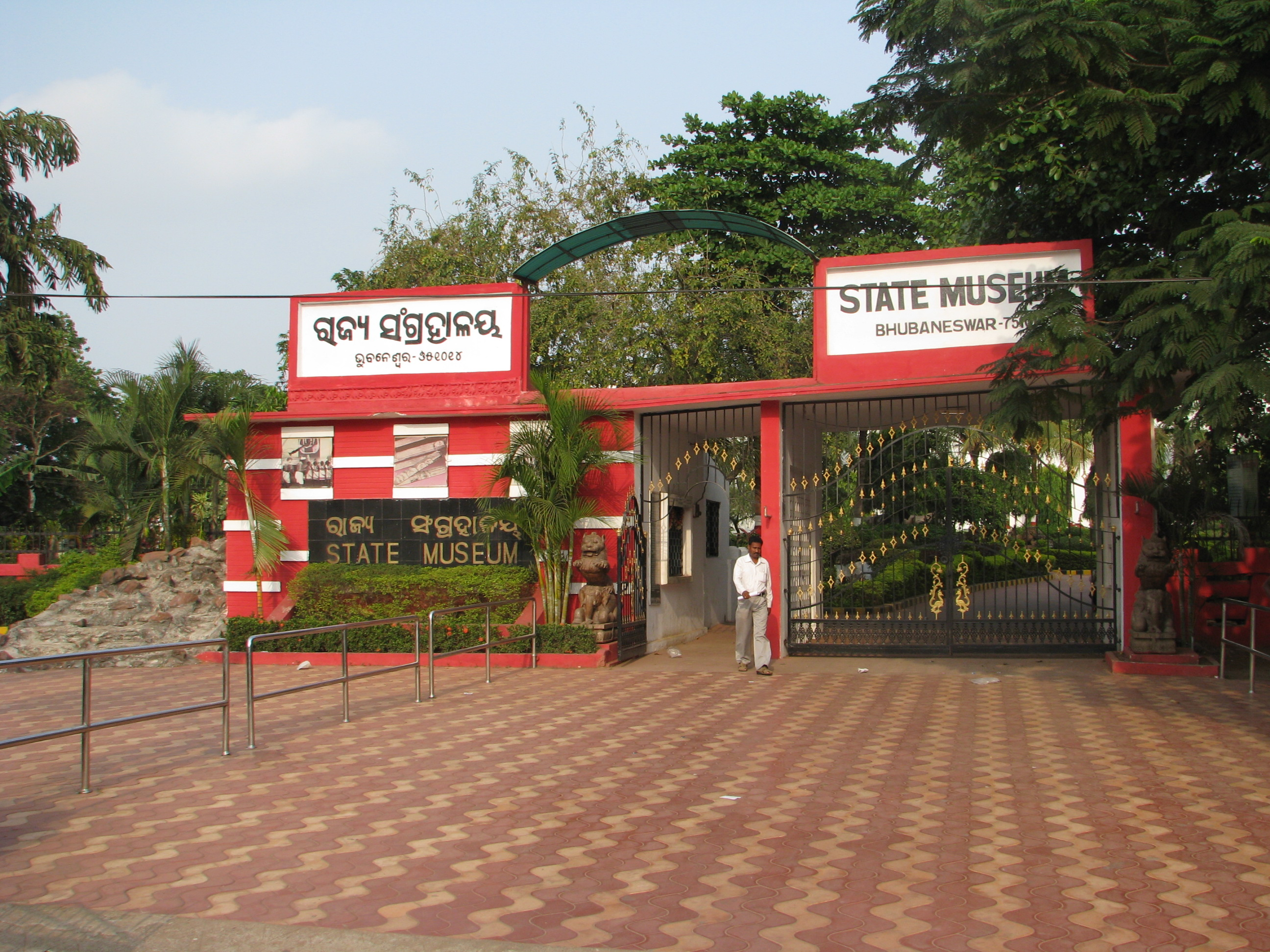
- Main entrance of the museum
- Established: 1932; 94 years ago
- Location: BJB Nagar, Bhubaneswar, India
- Coordinates: 20.2562°N 85.8415°E
- Director: Manjushree Samantarai
- Owner: Government of Odisha
- Website: odishamuseum.nic.in

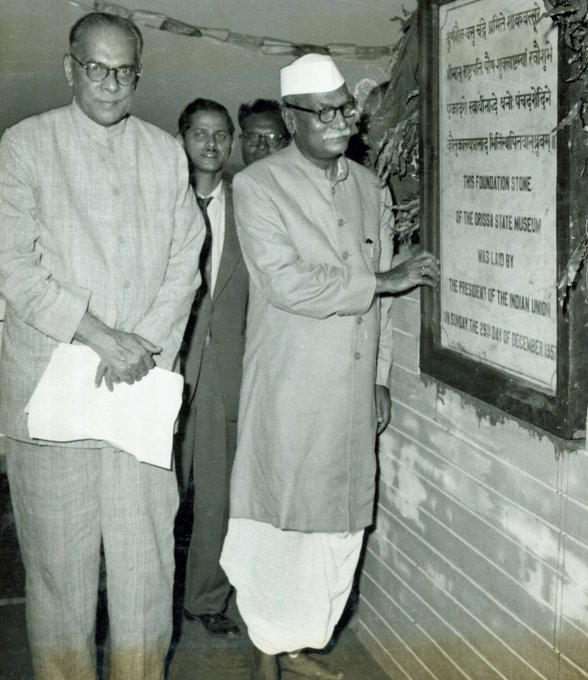
Rajendra Prasad laying foundation stone of the new building of Orissa State Museum

Odisha State Museum is a museum in Bhubaneswar, Odisha. In its original form it was established in 1932 and later moved to the current building in 1960. The museum is divided into eleven sections, viz, Archaeology, Epigraphy, Numismatics, Armoury, Mining & Geology, Natural History, Art & Craft, Contemporary Art, Patta Painting, Anthropology and Palmleaf Manuscripts. The museum is headed by a superintendent and the administrative control lies in the hands of Cultural Affairs Department, Government of Odisha.

== History ==
The origin of this museum can be traced back to 1932, when some historians and professors, like William Jones, Ghanashyam Das, N. C. Banerjee, Harekrushna Mahatab established a museum in Ravenshaw College, Cuttack. In 1945–46, the museum was shifted to Brahmananda building in old Bhubaneswar and given the status of a state museum by the government of Odisha. Later, the museum was shifted to Patel Hall in 1950 and again to another building in Unit I, Bhubaneswar. In 1957, the foundation of the museum was laid by then president of India Rajendra Prasad, and finally the museum in the current building started operating from 1960.

== Galleries ==
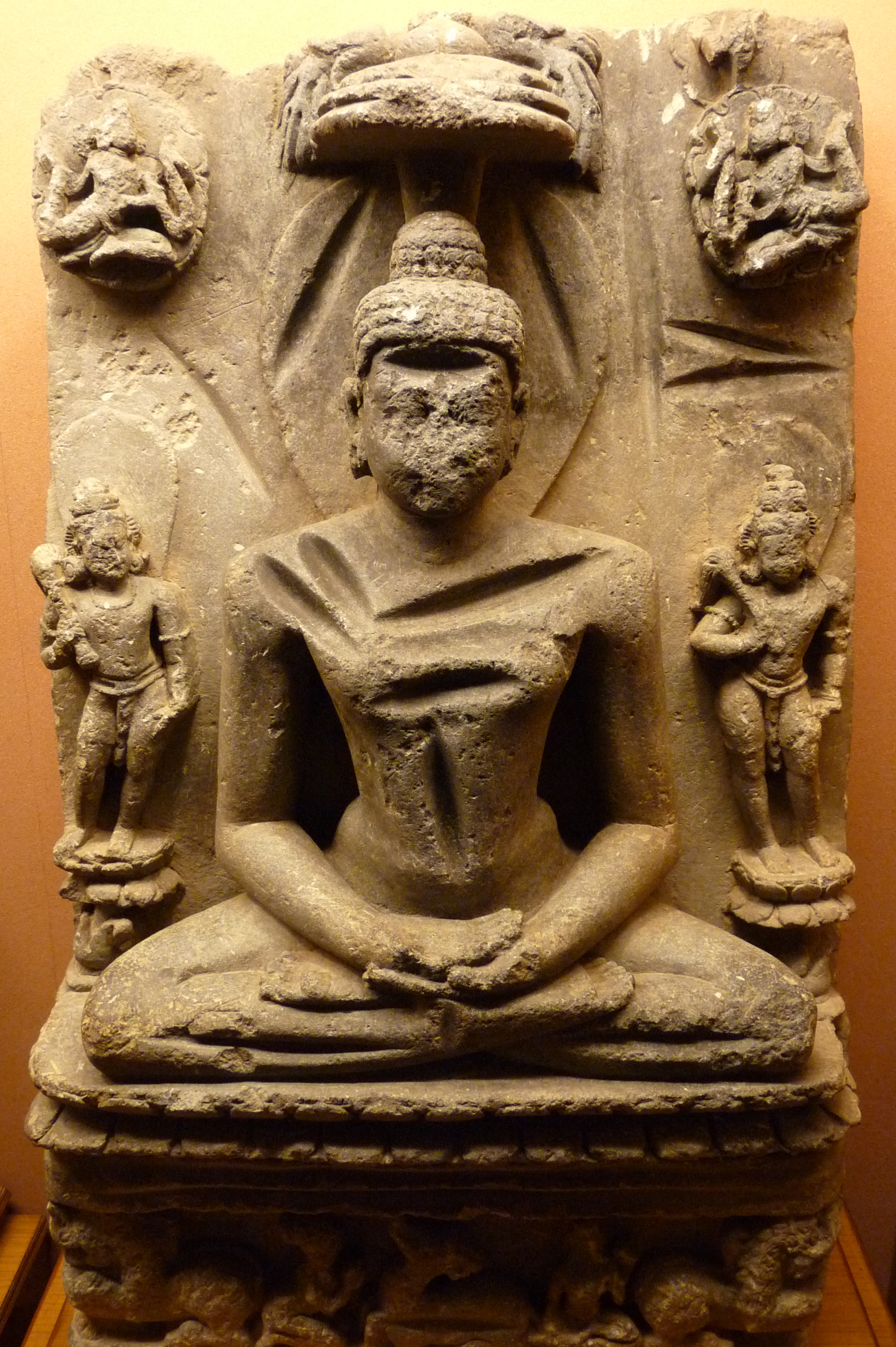
A statue of Buddha in the archaeology section

- Archaeology
- Contemporary art
- Epigraphy
- Numismatic
- Arms and ammunitions
- Art and craft
- Mining & Geology
- Anthropology
- Sanskrit manuscript
- Patta painting

== Timings ==
Opening timing is 10:00 AM to 5:00 PM all days of the week except Monday.

== Photography ==
Photography is allowed inside the museum; prior permission needs to be taken while taking the tickets.

== See also ==
- List of Museums in Odisha
