= Tata Steel BSL =

Indian company

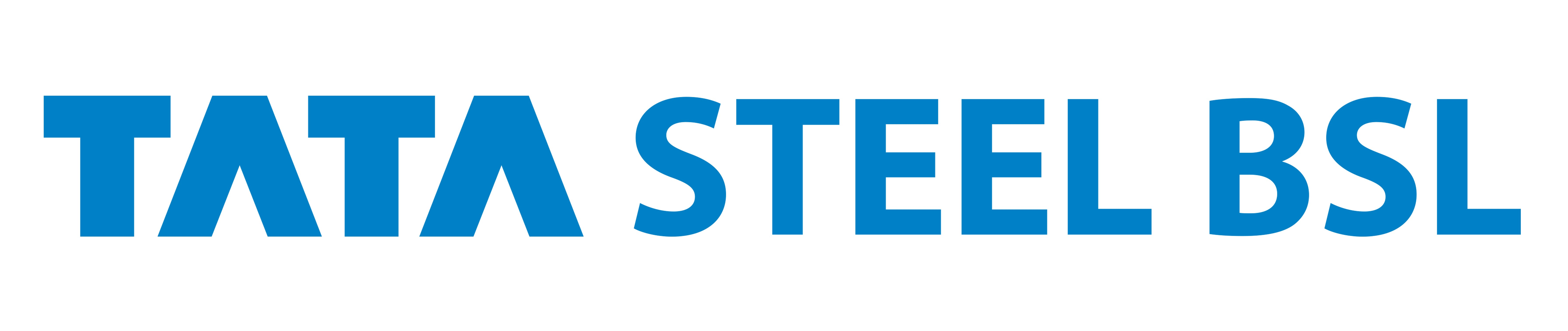
- Formerly: Jawahar Metal Industries Private Limited (1983–1992); Bhushan Steel & Strips Limited (1992–2007); Bhushan Steel (2007–2018)
- Type: Public
- Traded as: BSE: 500055; NSE: TATASTLBSL
- ISIN: INE824B01021
- Industry: Steel
- Founded: 7 January 1983; 43 years ago in Sahibabad, Uttar Pradesh, India
- Defunct: 11 November 2021; 4 years ago
- Fate: Merged with Tata Steel
- Successor: Tata Steel
- Headquarters: Jasmine Towers, 31 Shakespeare Sarani, Kolkata, West Bengal, India
- Key people: T. V. Narendran (Chairman & Non-Executive Adnl. Director); Rajeev Singhal (MD)
- Products: Cold rolled, galvanised, Bhushan Galume, Tata Shaktee, colour coated tiles, drawn tubes, strips, wire rods, alloy billets, sponge iron
- Revenue: ▲US$1.7 billion
- Number of employees: 5000+
- Parent: Tata Steel
- Website: Official website

Tata Steel BSL Limited, formerly Bhushan Steel Limited, was the largest manufacturer of auto-grade steel in India.

== History ==
The company was founded on 7 January 1983 under the name Jawahar Metal Industries Private Limited in the Sahibabad Industrial Area of Ghaziabad district, Uttar Pradesh. The company manufactured cold rolled steel strips and steel ingots. On 14 January 1987, Jawahar Metal Industries was acquired by Brij Bhushan Singal and his sons, Sanjay and Neeraj Singal. Jawahar Metal Industries was renamed as Bhushan Steel & Strips Limited on 9 June 1992. The name was changed to Bhushan Steel Limited in 2007.

Insolvency proceedings were initiated against the company on 26 July 2017 under the Insolvency and Bankruptcy Code, 2016.

=== Merger with Tata Steel ===
Tata Steel acquired a 72.65% stake in Bhushan Steel on 18 May 2018 through its subsidiary Bamnipal Steel. Tata Steel paid ₹35,200 crore (equivalent to ₹510 billion or US$5.3 billion in 2026) to Bhushan Steel's creditor banks, and an additional ₹1,200 crore (equivalent to ₹18 billion or US$180 million in 2026) over 12 months to Bhushan Steel's operational creditors. The company was renamed as Tata Steel BSL Limited on 27 November 2018.

On 25 April 2019, the Tata Steel board approved the merger of Tata Steel BSL and Bamnipal Steel with itself. The merger became effective on 11 November 2021.

== Plants ==
The Khopoli plant in Maharashtra was commissioned in 2004 and has been producing colour-coated sheets, high-tensile steel strappings, hardened and tempered steel strips for the first time in India, along with CRCA steel to cater to the needs of the automobile industry.

At its Sahibabad plant in Ghaziabad, Uttar Pradesh, it has a 1700 mm mill, which produces the widest sheets in India for the automotive industry. It has highly automated systems.

At its Meramandali, Dhenkanal Integrated steel plant in Odisha, Tata Steel BSL produces hot rolled coils and has mills for hot rolling. Construction of the first phase is being carried out.

== Financial Management ==
Gross sales of Tata Steel BSL grew from Rs. 5 billion in 2001 to Rs. 40 billion in 2007. It earned net profits of Rs. 3.13 billion in 2007 and exported goods worth Rs. 12.57 billion. Its exports include steel for both the automotive and white goods industry and the list of countries to which it exports includes several developed countries.
