= Orient Paper Mills =

Paper crafts manufacturer in Amlai, India

Orient Paper Mill is a paper and paper crafts manufacturer in Amlai (Madhya Pradesh), India. It has been associated with paper manufacture in Africa. The mill is part of Orient Paper & Industries which comprises the paper facility and manufacturers of Portland cement and ceiling fans, and which itself is a subsidiary of CK Birla Group.

Orient has worked with Pan African Paper Mills in Kenya, in partnership with the Government of Kenya and the International Finance Corporation.

The Orient Paper Mill was awarded the Golden Peacock Environment Management Award for 2006 by the World Environment Foundation (WEF).

== See also ==
- CK Birla Group
