= Talcher Coalfield =

Coalfield in Odisha, India

- Location in Odisha Talcher Coalfield (India)
- Location: Talcher, Odisha, India; 20°58′N 85°08′E
- Company: Mahanadi Coalfields Limited (MCL)
- Website: http://www.mcl.gov.in
- Acquired: 1992

Talcher Coalfield is located in Angul district in the Indian state of Odisha, in the valley of the Brahmani.Talcher is famous for its rich coal reserves and coal mining industry. Located in the state of Odisha, India, Talcher is a major center of coal production and home to several large coal mining operations. The region is known for its extensive coal fields, which have made it an important hub for coal-based industries and thermal power generation in the country.

== The coalfield ==
According to Geological Survey of India, the Talcher Coalfield has reserves of 38.65 billion tonnes, the highest in India.

Talcher Coalfield covers an area of 500 km^{2} (190 sq mi). The coal is of lower grade containing only about 35 per cent of fixed carbon, 70 per cent volatile matter and 25 per cent ash content. As of 2011, nearly one hundred thousand tonnes of coal is dispatched daily to power stations in Odisha, Tamil Nadu, Andhra Pradesh, West Bengal and other parts of India.

== History ==
Coal was discovered in the Talcher Coalfields at Gopalprasad in 1837. Handidhua Colliery was opened by M/s Villiers in 1921. NCDC opened several mines – at South Balanda in 1960, Nandira in 1962 and Jagannath in 1972. Production rose from 0.91 million tonnes in 1972-73 to 33.10 million tonnes in 2001-02. Talcher Coalfield is subdivided into five production/ administrative areas: Talcher, Jagannath, Kalinga, Lingaraj and Hingula.

== Transport ==
Talcher Coalfield was linked by a rail line taking off from Nergundi on the east coast in 1922.
