= Mahanadi Coalfields =

Indian coal company

Mahanadi Coalfields Limited (MCL)
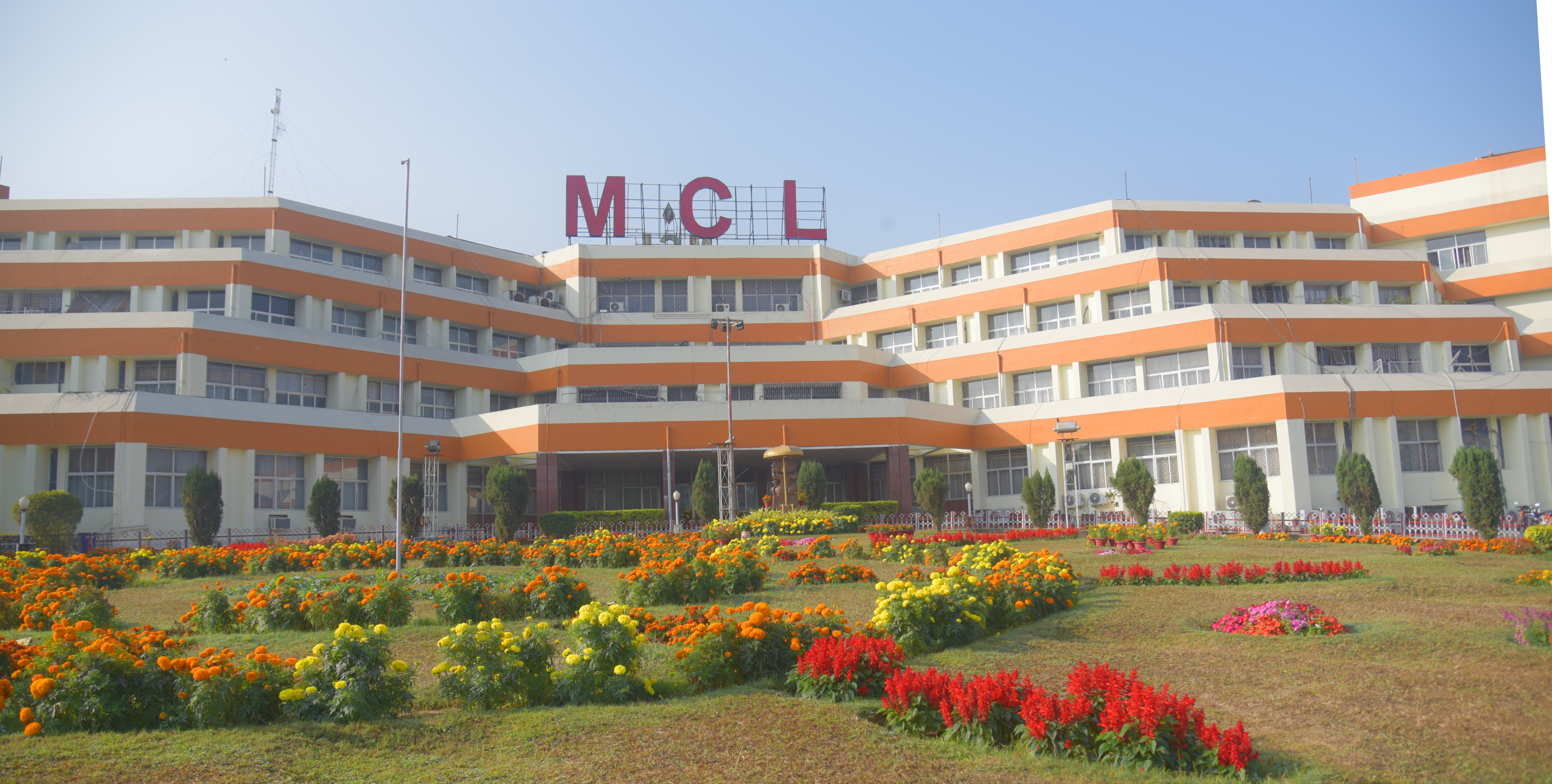
- Company type: Public sector undertakings(PSU)
- Industry: Coal Mining
- Founded: 1992
- Headquarters: Sambalpur, Odisha, India
- Area served: India
- Key people: Shri Uday A Kaole (Chairman & MD)
- Products: Bituminous Coal
- Revenue: ▲₹31,076.88 crore (US$3.2 billion)(FY24)
- Operating income: ▲₹19,316.79 crore (US$2.0 billion)(FY24)
- Net income: ▲₹10,176.35 crore (US$1.1 billion) (FY24
- Total assets: ▲₹22,670.97 crore (US$2.4 billion) (FY24)
- Owner: Government of India
- Number of employees: 22,352 (1 April 2019)
- Website: www.mahanadicoal.in

Mahanadi Coalfields Limited (MCL) is a major coal-producing company in India and one of the eight subsidiaries of the state-owned Coal India Limited. It was carved out of South Eastern Coalfields Limited in 1992, with its headquarters located in Sambalpur.

MCL operates coal mines across Odisha, with a total of seven open-cast mines and three underground mines in Jharsuguda district and Angul district.

MCL has two subsidiaries with private companies as a joint venture. The name of these companies are MJSJ Coal Limited & MNH Shakti Ltd.

There are 45 sanctioned mining projects in MCL with a capacity of 190.83 Mty of coal. The total capital outlay of 45 projects is ₹6,076.78 crore (US$630 million) & out of which 28 with a total capacity of 73.98 Mty have been completed by 1 April 2009 with a sanctioned capital investment of ₹2,348.61 crore (US$250 million). Out of the 28 completed projects, 2 have been exhausted (Balanda OCP & Basundhara-East OCP). One Expn. Project, namely, Lajkura Expn. (2.50 Mty, 1.50 Mty incr.) It is going to be approved within a short period.

Approval of Garjanbahal OCP (10.00 Mty) has been stalled temporarily due to a delay in getting Forestry clearance. Seventeen ongoing projects, i.e., Kulda OCP (10.00 Mty), Bhubaneswari OCP (20.00 Mty), Kaniha OCP (10.00 Mty), Bharatpur Expn. Ph.-III (9.00 Mty Incr.), Balaram OC Extn. (8.00 Mty), Ananta Expn. Ph.-III (3.00 Mty Incr.), Lakhanpur Expn. Ph.-III (5.00 Mty Incr.), Hingula Expn. Ph.-III (7.00 Mty Incr.), Talcher West) UG (0.52 Mty), Natraj U/G (0.64 Mty), Jagannath U/G (0.67 Mty), Bharatpur OC Expn. Ph-II (6.00 Mty Incr.), Lakhanpur Expn. (5.00 Mty Incr.), HBI UG Aug. (0.42 Mty), Basundhara (W) Expn. (4.60 Mty Incr.) and two JV projects, Gopalprasad OCP (15.00 Mty), Talabira OCP (20.00 Mty), with a capital investment of ₹3,728.17 crore (US$390 million) are under implementation.

In December 2024, the company has produced 203 MT of coal, reflecting a 9.8 percent increase compared to the previous year. In 2021, South Eastern Coalfields Limited (SECL) was the largest coal-producing subsidiary of Coal India Limited (CIL). However, in 2022, SECL’s production declined to 142.5 MT, and MCL surpassed it with a coal output of 168.2 MT.
