= Kesinga railway station =

Railway station in Odisha, India

Kesinga

General information
- Location: Kesinga, Odisha; India
- Coordinates: 20°11′26″N 83°13′23″E
- System: Indian Railways station
- Owner: Ministry of Railways, Indian Railways
- Lines: Raipur–Vizianagaram line Jharsuguda–Vizianagaram line
- Platforms: 4
- Tracks: 4

Construction
- Structure type: Standard (on ground)
- Parking: Yes

Other information
- Status: Functioning
- Station code: KSNG
- Zone(s): East Coast Railway
- Division(s): Sambalpur

History
- Opened: 1931
Location
- Location within India Location within Odisha

Kesinga railway station is a railway station on the East Coast Railway network in the state of Odisha, India. It serves Kesinga town. Its code is KSNG. It has four platforms. Passenger, Express and Superfast trains halt at Kesinga railway station.

== Trains ==
The following major trains halt at Kesinga railway station in both directions:

- Rourkela–Jagdalpur Express
- Visakhapatnam–Bhagat Ki Kothi Express
- Korba–Visakhapatnam Express
- Dhanbad–Alappuzha Express
- Hatia–Bangalore Cantonment Express
- Tatanagar–Yesvantpur Weekly Express
- Hatia–Yesvantpur Superfast Express
- Ratna Express
- Dharti Aaba AC Superfast Express
- Puri–Ahmedabad Express
- Gandhidham–Puri Weekly Express
- Tatanagar–Yesvantpur Superfast Express
- Sambalpur–Rayagada Intercity Express
- Bilaspur–Tirupati Express
- Samata Express
- Samaleshwari Express
- Visakhapatnam–Lokmanya Tilak Terminus Superfast Express
- Nagavali Express
- Durg–Jagdalpur Express

== See also ==
- Kalahandi district
