= Balangir Junction railway station =

Railway station in Odisha

Balangir Junction

General information
- Location: Balangir, Odisha; India
- Coordinates: 20°42′N 83°30′E
- Elevation: 185 m (607 ft)
- System: Indian Railway
- Owner: Indian Railways
- Operator: East Coast Railway
- Lines: Jharsuguda–Vizianagaram line and Khurda Road–Bolangir line (under construction)
- Platforms: 3
- Tracks: 5 ft 6 in (1,676 mm) broad gauge

Construction
- Structure type: Standard (on-ground station)
- Parking: Available

Other information
- Status: Functioning
- Station code: BLGR
- Zone(s): East Coast Railway
- Division(s): Sambalpur

History
- Opened: 1931; 95 years ago
- Rebuilt: 2018
- Former names: Bengal Nagpur Railway

Passengers
- 75000 per day

Services
Preceding station	Indian Railways	Following station
Bichhupali towards ?	East Coast Railway zone Khurda Road -Bolangir line	Terminus
Loisingha towards ?	East Coast Railway zone Titlagarh–Jharsuguda branch line	Deogaon Road towards ?
Location
- Location within Odisha Location within India

Balangir Junction railway station is a railway station which serves Balangir district in the Indian state of Odisha.

== History ==
The 79 km (49 mi) Vizianagaram–Parvatipuram line was opened in 1908–09. The Parvatipuram–Raipur line was completed in 1931. In 1960, Indian Railway took up three projects: the Kottavalasa–Koraput–Jeypore–Kirandaul line (Dandakaranya Project), the Titlagarh–Bolangir–Jharsuguda Project and the Rourkela–Kiriburu Project. All the three projects taken together were popularly known as the DBK Project or the Dandakaranya Bolangir Kiriburu Project. The Sambalpur–Titlagarh line was opened to traffic in 1963.

== Railway reorganisation ==
The Bengal Nagpur Railway was nationalised in 1944. Eastern Railway was formed on 14 April 1952 with the portion of East Indian Railway Company east of Mughalsarai and the Bengal Nagpur Railway. In 1955, South Eastern Railway was carved out of Eastern Railway. It comprised lines mostly operated by BNR earlier. Amongst the new zones started in April 2003 were East Coast Railway and South East Central Railway. Both these railways were carved out of South Eastern Railway.

== Khurda Road–Balangir rail link ==
The Khurda Balangir rail link was surveyed in 1945 but the project was sanctioned in 1994–95. The stretch of only 41.5 kilometres (25.8 mi) from Khurda Road to Rajsunakhala has been constructed out of the 289 kilometres (180 mi) project. The work on infrastructure started in 2007. The state government has signed Memorandum of Understanding with Indian railways to undertake some parts of the project on cost sharing basis. The project which was initially estimated to be ₹1,000 crore (US$100 million) is now estimated to be nearly ₹2,000 crore (US$210 million) after almost 20 years of delay due to low budgetary provisions and issues of land acquisition. This rail line will link cities of Nayagarh, Boudh and Sonepur with Bhubaneswar and Balangir. Smaller towns like Dasapalla, Banigocha and Manipur will also be linked by this rail line. Work at Balangir side of this project has also started.

== Trains ==
The following trains halt at Balangir Junction railway station in both directions:

- Hatia–Yesvantpur Superfast Express
- Tatanagar–SMVT Bengaluru Weekly Superfast Express
- Tambaram-Jasidih Ratna Express
- Hatia–SMVT Bengaluru Weekly Express
- Tatanagar–Yesvantpur Weekly Express
- Dhanbad–Alappuzha Express
- Tatanagar–Ernakulam Express
- Rourkela-Jagdalpur Express
- Puri–Ahmedabad Weekly Express
- Gandhidham–Puri Weekly Superfast Express
- Dharti Aaba AC Superfast Express
- Puri–Surat Express
- Puri–Durg Express
- Lokmanya Tilak Terminus–Puri Superfast Express
- Puri–Sainagar Shirdi Express
- Puri–Ajmer Express
- Visakhapatnam-Banaras Express
- Sambalpur–Rayagada Intercity Express
- Ispat Express
- Samaleshwari Express
- Nagavali Express
- Bhubaneswar–Bolangir Intercity Superfast Express
- Puri-Sonepur Weekly Express
- Boudh-Bhubaneswar New Weekly Express
- Sambalpur-Boudh Weekly Express

== Electrification ==
Electrification of the Titlagarh–Sambalpur–Jharsuguda was completed in 2018.
