= Bargarh Road railway station =

Railway station in Odisha, India

Bargarh Road

General information
- Location: Bargarh, Bargarh district, Odisha; India
- Coordinates: 21°19′59″N 83°38′37″E
- Elevation: 184 m (604 ft)
- System: Indian Railways station
- Owner: Indian Railways
- Operator: East Coast Railway
- Lines: Jharsuguda–Vizianagaram line, Bargarh Road-Nawapara Road line(under construction)
- Platforms: 3
- Tracks: 4

Construction
- Structure type: Standard (on-ground station)
- Parking: Available

Other information
- Status: Functioning
- Station code: BRGA
- Zone(s): East Coast Railway
- Division(s): Sambalpur

History
- Opened: 1931;93 years ago
- Rebuilt: 2021
- Former names: Bengal Nagpur Railway
Location
- Location within Odisha Location within India

Bargarh Road railway station is a railway station near Bargarh city of Bargarh district, Odisha. It serves Bargarh city. Its code is BRGA. It has three platforms. Passenger, Express, and Superfast trains halt here.

== Trains ==
The following trains halt at Bargarh Road railway station in both directions:

- Hatia–Yesvantpur Superfast Express
- Tatanagar–Yesvantpur Superfast Express
- Chennai Central–Asansol Ratna Express
- Hatia–Bangalore Cantonment Express
- Tatanagar–Yesvantpur Weekly Express
- Dhanbad–Alappuzha Express
- Tatanagar–Alappuzha Express
- Koraput–Rourkela Express
- Puri–Ahmedabad Weekly Express
- Gandhidham–Puri Weekly Superfast Express
- Puri–Surat Express
- Puri–Durg Express
- Lokmanya Tilak Terminus–Puri Superfast Express
- Puri–Sainagar Shirdi Express
- Puri–Ajmer Express
- Sambalpur–Rayagada Intercity Express
- Ispat Express
- Samaleshwari Express
- Nagavali Express
- Bhubaneswar–Bolangir Intercity Superfast Express
