= Mahasamund railway station =

Railway station in Chhattisgarh

Mahasamund

General information
- Location: Station Road near Gurudwara front of Akalpurak Hospital Mahasamund, Chhattisgarh; India
- Coordinates: 21.1133°N 82.1040°E
- Elevation: 302 metres (991 ft)
- System: Indian Railways station
- Owner: Indian Railways
- Operator: East Coast Railway
- Line: Raipur (SECR)–Vizianagram (ECOR) line
- Platforms: 3
- Tracks: 6

Construction
- Structure type: Standard (on ground station)
- Parking: Yes
- Cycle facilities: Yes

Other information
- Status: Active
- Station code: MSMD
- Zone(s): East Coast Railway
- Division(s): Sambalpur

History
- Opened: 1931
Location

Mahasamund Railway Station is the principal station of Mahasamund, Chhattisgarh, India. It is an important station of the Sambalpur railway division of the East Coast Railway zone.

== Facilities ==
Mahasamund station is a model station declared in the Railway Budget. It has a computerised reservation counter, parking, a canteen, a cloak room, a waiting hall, a goods shed, and an automatic announcer. An R.P.F. police station is also located in the station. Mahasamund falls under East Coast Railway zone Sambalpur railway division so this city lacks some standard facilities.

Dualling of the railway track from Raipur, Mahasamund to Titlagarh is in progress and may be completed in October 2019. The Mahasamund–Arand section is complete. Two new platforms have been sanctioned and construction started. Now Railway Board is decided to generate new additional Divisional Railway Manager post in Mahasamund.

== List of major trains ==
- Lokmnanya Tilak Terminus–Puri Superfast Express (via Sambalpur)
- Gandhidham–Puri Weekly Express (via Vizianagaram)
- Gandhidham–Puri Weekly Superfast Express (via Sambalpur)
- Puri–Ahmedabad Express (via Vizianagaram)
- Puri–Ahmedabad Weekly Express (via Sambalpur)
- Puri–Durg Express
- Puri–Sainagar Shirdi Express
- Puri–Ajmer Express
- Samata Express
- Visakhapatnam–Bhagat Ki Kothi Express
- Visakhapatnam–Lokmanya Tilak Terminus Superfast Express
- Korba–Visakhapatnam Express
- Bilaspur–Tirupati Express
- Durg–Jagdalpur Express
- Junagarh Road–Raipur Passenger
- Titlagarh–Raipur Passenger
- Raipur–Visakhapatnam Passenger
- Durg–Visakhapatnam Passenger
- Durg vishakhapatnam vande Bharat express 20829/20830

== Nearby attractions ==
- Sirpur
- Barnawapara Wildlife Sanctuary
- Rajim
- Sanjay Kanan Picnic Spot
