= Rupra Road railway station =

Railway Station in Odisha, India

Rupra Road

General information
- Location: Rupra Road, Odisha; India
- Coordinates: 20°05′05″N 83°19′53″E
- System: Indian Railways station
- Owner: Ministry of Railways, Indian Railways
- Line: Jharsuguda–Vizianagaram line
- Platforms: 3
- Tracks: 3

Construction
- Structure type: Standard (on ground)
- Parking: No

Other information
- Status: Functioning
- Station code: RPRD
- Zone(s): East Coast Railway
- Division(s): Sambalpur
Location
- Location within India Location within Odisha

Rupra Road railway station is a railway station on the East Coast Railway network in the state of Odisha, India. It serves Rupra village. Its code is RPRD. It has three platforms. Passenger, Express trains halt at Rupra Road railway station.

== Major trains ==
- Korba–Visakhapatnam Express
- Dhanbad–Alappuzha Express
- Sambalpur–Rayagada Intercity Express
- Bilaspur–Tirupati Express
- Samata Express
- Samaleshwari Express
- Durg–Jagdalpur Express

== See also ==
- Kalahandi district
