= Samaleshwari Express =

Train in India

Overview
- Service type: Express
- Locale: West Bengal, Jharkhand, Odisha, Chhattisgarh
- Current operator: South Eastern Railway

Route
- Termini: Howrah (HWH); Jagdalpur (JDB)
- Stops: 33
- Distance travelled: 1,163 km (723 mi)
- Average journey time: 23hrs 40mins
- Service frequency: Daily (Note: Runs seven days in a week for every direction.)
- Train number: 18005 / 18006

On-board services
- Classes: AC First, AC 2 tier, AC 3 tier, Sleeper class, General Unreserved
- Seating arrangements: Yes
- Sleeping arrangements: Yes
- Catering facilities: On-board catering, E-catering
- Observation facilities: Large windows
- Baggage facilities: No
- Other facilities: Below the seats

Technical
- Rolling stock: LHB coach
- Track gauge: 1,676 mm (5 ft 6 in)
- Operating speed: 49 km/h (30 mph) average including halts.

The 18005 / 18006 Samaleswari Express is an Express train belonging to South Eastern Railway zone that runs between Howrah Junction and Jagdalpur in India. It is currently being operated with 18005/18006 train numbers on a daily basis.

== Service ==
The 18005/Samaleswari Express has an average speed of 46 km/h and covers 1165 km in 25h 15m. The 18006/Samaleswari Express has an average speed of 45 km/h and covers 1165 km in 25h 55m.

== Route and halts ==
The important halts of the train are:

- Howrah Junction
- Uluberia
- Kharagpur Junction
- Tatanagar Junction
- Chakradharpur
- Rourkela Junction
- Jharsuguda Junction
- Sambalpur Junction
- Bargarh Road
- Balangir
- Titlagarh Junction
- Kesinga
- Rayagada
- Koraput Junction
- Jagdalpur

== Coach composition ==
The train has LHB rakes with a max speed of 130 kmph. The train consists of 19 coaches:

- 1 First AC
- 2 AC II Tier
- 3 AC III Tier
- 6 Sleeper coaches
- 5 General Unreserved
- 1 Luggage Rake
- 1 EOG

== Traction ==
As the route is electrified, it is are hauled by a Visakhapatnam Loco Shed-based WAP-7 electric locomotive from end to end .

== Direction reversal ==
The train reverses its direction twice at:

- Koraput Junction
- Rayagada.

== See also ==
- Howrah Junction railway station
- Jagdalpur railway station
