= Rourkela–Jagdalpur Express =

Train in India

Jagdalpur-Rourkela Express
Overview
- Service type: Express
- Locale: Odisha & Chatisgarh
- First service: 3rd July 2009
- Current operator: South Eastern Railway

Route
- Termini: Jagdalpur (JDB); Rourkela (ROU)
- Stops: 17
- Distance travelled: 751 km (467 mi)
- Average journey time: 16 hours 05 minutes
- Service frequency: Daily
- Train number: 18107 / 18108

On-board services
- Classes: AC 3 tier, Sleeper Class, General Unreserved
- Seating arrangements: Yes
- Sleeping arrangements: Yes
- Catering facilities: E-catering
- Baggage facilities: Available
- Other facilities: Below the seats

Technical
- Rolling stock: ICF coach
- Track gauge: 1,676 mm (5 ft 6 in) (Broad Gauge)
- Operating speed: 47 km/h (29 mph) average including halts.

The 18107 / 18108 Rourkela-Jagdalpur Express is a daily express train which runs between Jagdalpur and Rourkela. It is operated by the South Eastern Railway Zone of Indian Railways. It was introduced in the year 2009 as Rourkela-Koraput Express and later extended to Jagdalpur as an inter-city express.

== Coaches ==
The 18107 / 08 Rourkela Junction - Jagdalpur Express has two 3 AC, 4 Sleeper Coaches, 5 general unreserved & two SLR (seating with luggage rake) coaches . It does not carry a pantry car coach.

As is customary with most train services in India, coach composition may be amended at the discretion of Indian Railways depending on demand. During rush periods, usually additional coaches are added.

== Service ==
The 18107 Rourkela Junction - Jagdalpur Express covers the distance of 646 km (401 mi) in 13 hours 45 mins (47 km/h) and in 13 hours 30 mins as the 18108 Jagdalpur - Rourkela Junction Express (48 km/h). Currently this train services has been extended to Jagdalpur (Chhattisgarh). As of now the extension date has not yet been confirmed.

As the average speed of the train is lower than 55 km/h (34 mph), as per railway rules, its fare doesn't includes a Superfast surcharge.

== Routing ==
The 18107 / 08 Rourkela – Jagdalpur Express runs from Rourkela Junction via Jharsuguda Junction, Sambalpur Junction, Bargarh Road, Balangir Junction, Titlagarh Junction, Rayagada and Koraput. The Train Reverses its direction at Rayagada and Koraput Railway Station.

== Traction ==
As the route is electrified, Either BNDM Or TATA WAP-7 are its regular link end to end with SRC WAP-4 as occasional visitors, but earlier a WAM-4 from TATA shed was its link and WDM-3D and WDP-4D diesel locomotive From Bondamunda Shed pulled the train to its destination.
