= Khariar Road railway station =

Railway station in Odisha, India

Khariar Road

General information
- Location: Khariar, Odisha; India
- Coordinates: 20°54′04″N 82°30′40″E
- System: Indian Railways station
- Owner: Ministry of Railways, Indian Railways
- Line: Raipur–Vizianagaram line
- Platforms: 3
- Tracks: 4

Construction
- Structure type: Standard (on ground)
- Parking: No

Other information
- Status: Functioning
- Station code: KRAR
- Zone(s): East Coast Railway
- Division(s): Sambalpur
Location
- Location within India Location within Odisha

Khariar Road railway station is one of the important railway station located in Indian state of Odisha in Nuapada district. Its built on the East Coast Railway network It serves Khariar Road town. Its code is KRAR. It has three platforms. Passenger, Express and Superfast trains halts at Khariar Road railway station. It is 10 km away from Nuapada Railway station.

== Major trains ==
- Durg–Jagdalpur Express
- Korba–Visakhapatnam Express
- Gandhidham–Puri Weekly Superfast Express
- Puri–Ajmer Express
- Puri–Ahmedabad Express
- Puri–Ahmedabad Weekly Express
- Puri–Durg Express
- Samata Express
- Puri–Sainagar Shirdi Express
- Lokmanya Tilak Terminus–Puri Superfast Express
- Bilaspur–Tirupati Express
- Visakhapatnam–Bhagat Ki Kothi Express
- Visakhapatnam–Lokmanya Tilak Terminus Superfast Express

== See also ==
- Nuapada district
