= Saintala railway station =

Railway station in Odisha, India

Saintala

General information
- Location: Saintala, Odisha; India
- Coordinates: 20°25′59″N 83°20′03″E
- System: Indian Railways station
- Owner: Ministry of Railways, Indian Railways
- Line: Jharsuguda–Vizianagaram line
- Platforms: 2
- Tracks: 2

Construction
- Structure type: Standard (on ground)
- Parking: No

Other information
- Status: Functioning
- Station code: SFC
- Zone(s): East Coast Railway
- Division(s): Sambalpur
Location
- Location within India Location within Odisha

Saintala railway station is a railway station on the East Coast Railway network in the state of Odisha, India. It serves Saintala town. Its code is SFC. It has two platforms. Passenger, Express and Superfast trains halt at Saintala railway station.

== Major trains ==
- Puri–Durg Express
- Sambalpur–Rayagada Intercity Express
- Ispat Express
- Samaleshwari Express

== See also ==
- Balangir district
