= Kantabanji railway station =

Railway station in Odisha, India

Kantabanjhi

General information
- Location: Kantabanjhi, Balangir district, Odisha; India
- Coordinates: 20°28′26″N 82°54′26″E
- Elevation: 304 m (997 ft)
- System: Indian Railways
- Owner: Indian Railways
- Operator: East Coast Railway
- Line: Raipur–Vizianagaram line
- Platforms: 3
- Tracks: 6

Construction
- Structure type: Standard (on-ground station)
- Parking: Available

Other information
- Status: Functioning
- Station code: KBJ
- Zone(s): East Coast Railway
- Division(s): Sambalpur

History
- Opened: 1937
- Former names: Bengal Nagpur Railway
Location
- Location within Odisha Location within India

Kantabanji railway station is a railway station near Kantabanjhi town of Balangir district, Odisha. It serves Kantabanji town. Its code is KBJ. It has two platforms. Passenger, Express, and Superfast trains halt here.

== Trains ==
The following major trains halt at Kantabanji railway station in both directions:

- Visakhapatnam–Bhagat Ki Kothi Express
- Korba–Visakhapatnam Express
- Gandhidham–Puri Weekly Superfast Express
- Puri–Surat Express
- Puri–Ahmedabad Express
- Puri–Ahmedabad Weekly Express
- Gandhidham–Puri Weekly Express
- Puri–Ajmer Express
- Puri–Durg Express
- Lokmanya Tilak Terminus–Puri Superfast Express
- Puri–Sainagar Shirdi Express
- Samata Express
- Bilaspur–Tirupati Express
- Visakhapatnam–Lokmanya Tilak Terminus Superfast Express
- Durg–Jagdalpur Express
