= Visakhapatnam–Bhagat Ki Kothi Express =

Train in India

Visakhapatnam-Bhagat ki Kothi Express
Overview
- Service type: Express
- Locale: Andhra Pradesh, Odisha, Chhattisgarh, Madhya Pradesh & Rajasthan
- First service: 24 December 2013; 12 years ago
- Current operator: East Coast Railway

Route
- Termini: Visakhapatnam (VSKP); Bhagat Ki Kothi (BGKT)
- Stops: 34
- Distance travelled: 2,068 km (1,285 mi)
- Average journey time: 37 hours 20 minutes
- Service frequency: Weekly
- Train number: 18573 / 18574

On-board services
- Classes: AC first, AC 2 tier, AC 3 tier, Sleeper class, General Unreserved
- Seating arrangements: Yes
- Sleeping arrangements: Yes
- Catering facilities: Available
- Observation facilities: Large windows
- Baggage facilities: Available
- Other facilities: Below the seats

Technical
- Rolling stock: LHB coach
- Track gauge: 1,676 mm (5 ft 6 in)
- Operating speed: 130 km/h (81 mph) maximum, 55 km/h (34 mph) average including halts.
Route map
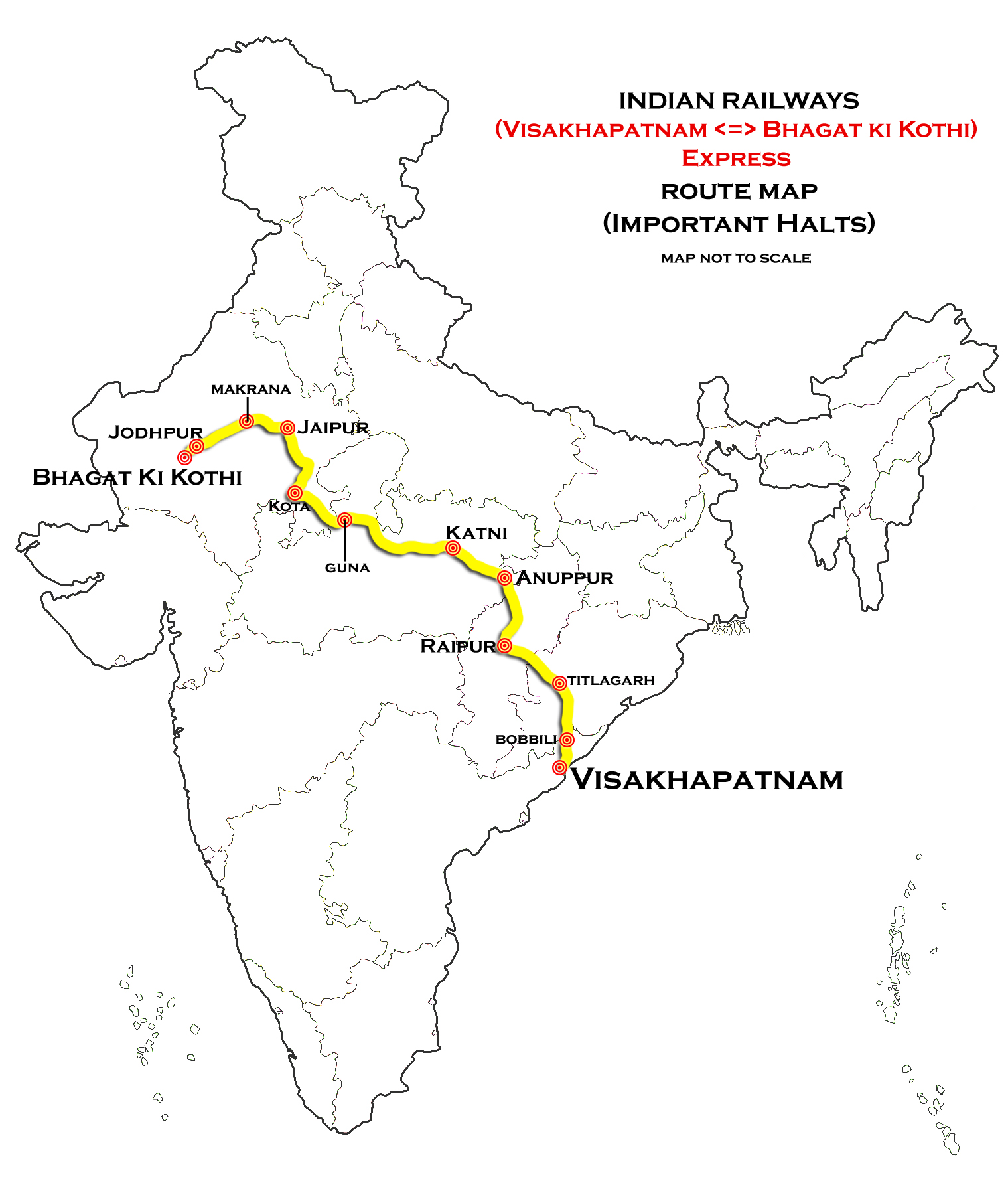

The 18573 / 18574 Visakhapatnam–Bhagat Ki Kothi Express is an Express which runs between Visakhapatnam in Andhra Pradesh and Bhagat Ki Kothi in Rajasthan. It was introduced on 2 January 2014. The Waltair railway division of the East Coast Railway division of the Indian Railways administers this train.

== History ==
It operates as train number 18573 from Visakhapatnam to Bhagat Ki Kothi and as train number 18574. It first ran as a holiday special from Visakhapatnam on 19–20 December 2013. Later it was inaugurated on 24 December by Union minister of state for commerce and industry, D.Purandeswari with train number 08575. Its regular run commenced on 2 January 2014 with train numbers 18573/18574.

== Coaches ==
During the holiday special run Visakhapatnam-Bhagat ki kothi Express has one AC 2tier, two AC 3tier, Eleven Sleeper, Six General unreserved and two guard cum luggage vans. The total composition is 22 Coaches.

There was an inaugural special run on 24 December 2013. It has one AC2-tier, one AC3-tier, Eight sleeper class, four general second class and two guard cum luggage vans. The total composition is 16 coaches.

During the regular run, it consists of 1 AC1 tier,3 AC2-tier, 4 AC3-tier, 10 sleeper, Six general second and two guard cum luggage vans. The total composition is 20 coaches.

| Loco | 1 | 2 | 3 | 4 | 5 | 6 | 7 | 8 | 9 | 10 | 11 | 12 | 13 | 14 | 15 | 16 | 17 | 18 | 19 | 20 | 21 | 22 | 23 | 24 | 25 | 26 | 27 | 28 |
|---|---|---|---|---|---|---|---|---|---|---|---|---|---|---|---|---|---|---|---|---|---|---|---|---|---|---|---|---|
| | SLR | UR | UR | UR | S1 | S2 | S3 | S4 | S5 | S6 | S7 | S8 | S9 | S10 | B1 | B2 | B3 | B4 | A1 | A2 | A3 | H1 | D2 | D1 | UR | UR | UR | SLR |

== Service ==
The Visakhapatnam-Bhagat ki kothi Express covers the distance of 2068 km in 37 hours 20 mins on journey towards Bhagat Ki Kothi and in 38 hours 10 mins on journey towards Visakhapatnam. 18573/18574 Visakhapatnam-Bhagat ki kothi Express averaging 55 km/h on journey towards Bhagat Ki Kothi and averaging 55 km/h on journey towards Visakhapatnam.

== Route & halts ==
- Visakhapatnam
- Vizianagaram Junction
- Rayagada
- Titlagarh Junction
- Kantabanji
- Khariar Road
- Mahasamund
- Raipur Junction
- Uslapur
- Anuppur Junction
- Shahdol
- Katni Murwara
- Damoh
- Saugor
- Guna Junction
- Kota Junction
- Sawai Madhopur
- Durgapura
- Jaipur Junction
- Phulera Junction
- Degana Junction
- Merta Road Junction
- Jodhpur Junction
- Bhagat Ki Kothi.

== Schedule ==
| Train Number | Station Code | Departure Station | Departure Time | Departure Day | Arrival Station | Arrival Time | Arrival Day |
|---|---|---|---|---|---|---|---|
| 18573 | VSKP | Visakhapatnam | 5:15 AM | Thursday | Bhagat Ki Kothi | 10:00 PM | Friday |
| 18574 | BGKT | Bhagat Ki Kothi | 2:00 PM | Saturday | Visakhapatnam | 7:55 AM | Monday |

== Direction reversals ==
The train reverses its direction thrice at;

- Raipur Junction
- Kota Junction
- Sawai Madhopur Junction.

== Traction ==
It is hauled by a Visakhapatnam Loco Shed based WAP-7 electric locomotive from Visakhapatnam to Sawai Madhopur Jn and bhagat ki kothi loco shed based WDP-4D diesel locomotive from Sawai Madhopur Jn to Bhagat ki kothi and vice-versa .
