= Samata Express =

Train in India

Overview
- Service type: Superfast
- Locale: Andhra Pradesh, Odisha, Chhattisgarh, Maharashtra, Madhya Pradesh, Rajasthan, Uttar Pradesh, Haryana & Delhi
- First service: 28 October 1997; 28 years ago
- Current operator: South Coast Railway
- Ridership: 5 Days in a Week

Route
- Termini: Visakhapatnam (VSKP); Hazrat Nizamuddin (NZM)
- Stops: 36
- Distance travelled: 1,917 km (1,191 mi)
- Average journey time: 32 hours 50 minutes
- Service frequency: 5 days a week.
- Train number: 12807 / 12808

On-board services
- Classes: AC 1 Tier, AC 2 tier, AC 3 tier, Sleeper Class, General Unreserved
- Seating arrangements: Yes
- Sleeping arrangements: Yes
- Catering facilities: Available
- Observation facilities: Large windows
- Baggage facilities: Available
- Other facilities: Below the seats

Technical
- Rolling stock: LHB coach
- Track gauge: 1,676 mm (5 ft 6 in); Broad Gauge
- Electrification: Yes
- Operating speed: 60 km/h (37 mph) average with halts 130 km/h (81 mph) Maximum Speed
Route map
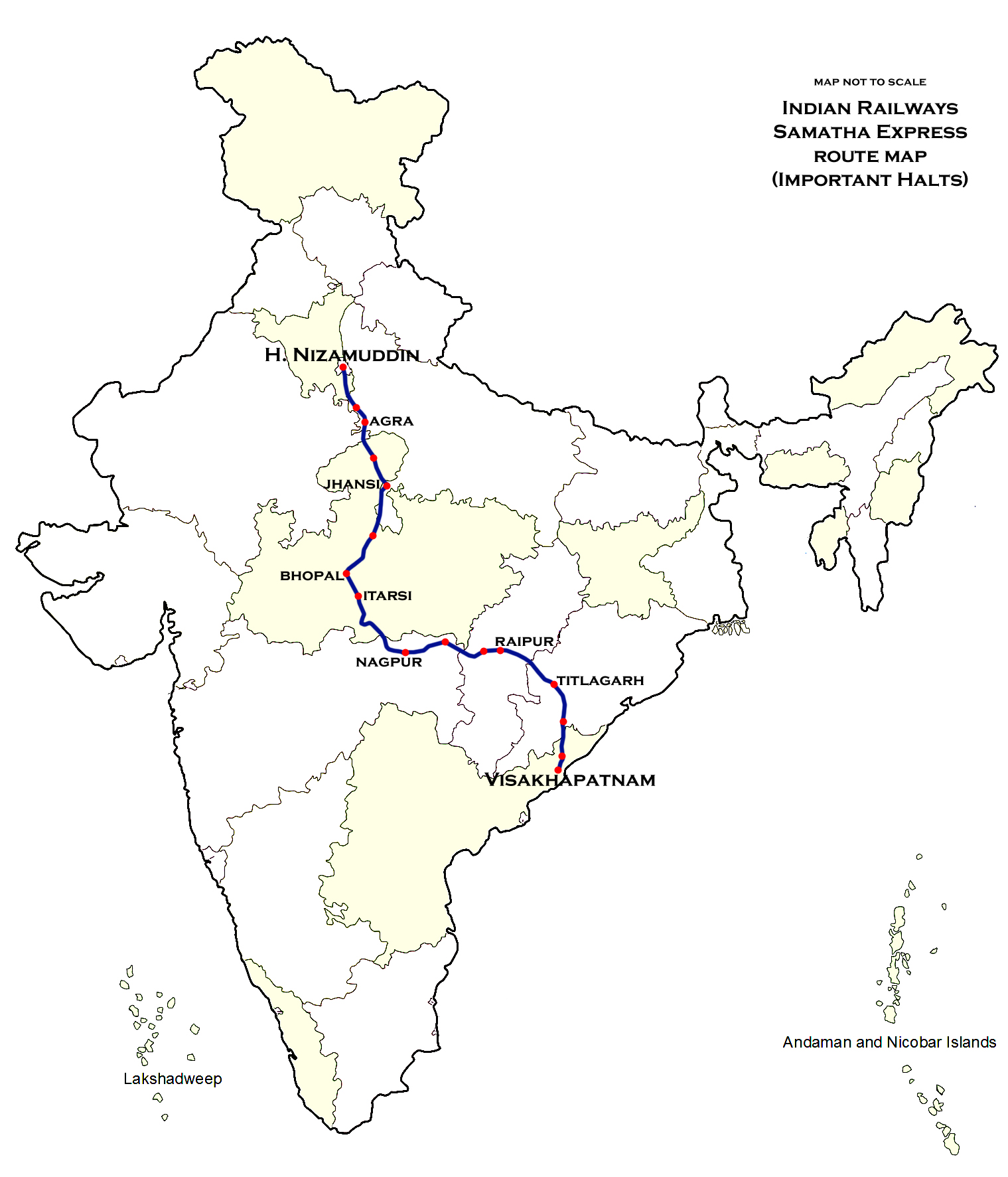

The 12807 / 12808 Samata Express is a superfast train between Visakhapatnam in Andhra Pradesh and Hazrat Nizamuddin in New Delhi. It is operated by South Coast Railway. Samata in Sanskrit means Equality.

== Service ==
Train No. 12807 leaves Visakhapatnam at mornings and arrives at Hazrat Nizamuddin, the next evening. Vice versa the return journey follows the same pattern. This train takes about 32 hours to reach from its source to destination. From April 2022, the train was running with Linke Hoffman Busch (LHB) rakes.

== Route and halts ==
- Visakhapatnam Junction
- Simhachalam
- Vizianagaram Junction
- Parvathipuram
- Rayagada
- Titlagarh
- Kesinga
- Kantabanji
- Khariar Road
- Mahasamund
- Raipur Junction
- Durg Junction
- Rajnandgaon
- Dongargarh
- Gondia Junction
- Nagpur Junction
- Betul
- Itarsi Junction
- Bhopal Junction
- Bina
- Lalitpur
- Jhansi Junction
- Gwalior Junction
- Agra Cantonment
- Mathura Junction
- Faridabad
- Hazrat Nizamuddin.

== Traction ==
It is hauled by a Visakhapatnam Loco Shed based WAP-7 electric locomotive from Visakhapatnam Junction to Nagpur Junction. And the handing over to a Tughlakabad Loco Shed based WAP-7 electric locomotive hauls the train up to Hazrat Nizamuddin and vice versa.

== Rake sharing ==
The train sharing its rake with 12803/12804 Visakhapatnam Swarna Jayanti Express

== Incident ==
On 6 June 2010, the train had a derailment near Arand railways station in Chhattisgarh, however nobody was injured.

== See also ==
- Visakhapatnam Swarna Jayanti Express
