= Durg–Jagdalpur Express =

Train in India

Overview
- Service type: Express
- First service: 11 October 2012; 13 years ago
- Current operator: South East Central Railway zone

Route
- Termini: Durg Junction (DURG); Jagdalpur (JDB)
- Stops: 13
- Distance travelled: 659 km (409 mi)
- Average journey time: 14h 30m
- Service frequency: Tri-weekly (Note: Runs three days in a week for every direction.)
- Train number: 18211/18212

On-board services
- Classes: Sleeper class, General Unreserved
- Seating arrangements: No
- Sleeping arrangements: Yes
- Catering facilities: On-board catering E-catering
- Observation facilities: ICF coach
- Entertainment facilities: No
- Baggage facilities: No
- Other facilities: Below the seats

Technical
- Rolling stock: 2
- Track gauge: 1,676 mm (5 ft 6 in)
- Operating speed: 45 km/h (28 mph), including halts

The Durg–Jagadalpur Express is an Express train belonging to South East Central Railway zone that runs between Durg Junction and Jagdalpur in India. It is currently being operated with 18211/18212 train numbers on tri-weekly basis.

== Service ==
The 18211/Durg–Jagadalpur Express has an average speed of 45 kilometres per hour (28 mph) and covers 659 kilometres (409 mi) in 14h 30m. The 18212/Jagdalpur–Durg Express has an average speed of 40 kilometres per hour (25 mph) and covers 659 kilometres (409 mi) in 16h 20m.

== Route and halts ==
The important halts of the train are:

- Durg Junction
- Raipur Junction
- Mahasamund
- Khariar Road
- Kantabanji
- Titlagarh Junction
- Rayagada
- Koraput
- Jagdalpur

== Coach composition ==
The train has standard ICF rakes with a max speed of 110 kmph. The train consists of 10 coaches:

- 1 Sleeper coaches
- 7 General Unreserved
- 2 Seating cum Luggage Rake

== Traction ==
Both trains are hauled by a Raipur Loco Shed-based WDM-3A diesel locomotive from Durg to Jagdalpur and vice versa.

== Direction reversal ==
The train reverses its direction 2 times:

- Rayagada
- Koraput

== See also ==
- Durg Junction railway station
- Jagdalpur railway station
