= Talcher railway station =

Railway station in Odisha, India

Talcher

General information
- Location: Talcher, Odisha; India
- Coordinates: 20°55′56″N 85°12′02″E
- System: Indian Railways station
- Owner: Ministry of Railways, Indian Railways
- Line: Cuttack–Sambalpur line
- Platforms: 2
- Tracks: 3

Construction
- Structure type: Standard (on ground)
- Parking: Yes

Other information
- Status: Functioning
- Station code: TLHR
- Zone(s): East Coast Railway
- Division(s): Khurda Road

History
- Opened: 1922
Location
- Location within India Location within Odisha

Talcher railway station is a railway station on the East Coast Railway network in the state of Odisha, India. It serves Talcher city. Its code is TLHR. It has two platforms. Passenger, MEMU, Express and Superfast trains halt at Talcher railway station.

== Major trains ==
- Lokmanya Tilak Terminus–Puri Superfast Express
- Tapaswini Express
- Puri–Ahmedabad Weekly Express
- Puri–Durg Express
- Hirakud Express

== See also ==
- Angul district
