= Muribahal railway station =

Railway station in Odisha

Muribahal

General information
- Location: Muribahal, Odisha; India
- Coordinates: 20°23′00″N 83°01′11″E
- System: Indian Railways station
- Owner: Ministry of Railways, Indian Railways
- Line: Raipur–Vizianagaram line
- Platforms: 2
- Tracks: 4

Construction
- Structure type: Standard (on ground)
- Parking: No

Other information
- Status: Functioning
- Station code: MRBL
- Zone(s): East Coast Railway
- Division(s): Sambalpur
Location
- Location within India Location within Odisha

Muribahal railway station is a railway station on the East Coast Railway network in the state of Odisha, India. It serves Muribahal village. Its code is MRBL. It has two platforms. Passenger, Express trains halt at Muribahal railway station.

== Major trains ==
- Korba–Visakhapatnam Express
- Puri–Durg Express

== See also ==
- Balangir district
