= LSX =

LSX may refer to:

- Lao Securities Exchange, the primary stock exchange in Laos
- LSX, the station code for Loisingha railway station, Odisha, India
- National Weather Service St. Louis, Missouri (WFO ID LSX)
- A General Motors LS-based small-block engine
