= Nagavalli =

Nagavalli is the Sanskrit name for the betel (piper betel) plant.

It may also refer to the following in Indian media:

- Nagavalli (film), a 2010 Telugu horror and drama, a remake of the 2010 Kannada film Aptharakshaka
- Nagavalli (Manichitrathazhu), a character in Manichitrathazhu, a 1993 Malayalam psychological thriller film
- Nagavalli, a character in Apthamitra, a 2004 Kannada film and remake of Manichitrathazhu
- Nagavalli, a character in Aptharakshaka, a 2005 Kannada film and sequel to Apthamitra
- "Nagavalli", a single by the Indian metal band The Down Troddence
- Venu Nagavally (1949–2010), alternately spelled as Venu Nagavalli, Indian actor, screenwriter and director

== See also ==
- Nagavali Express, an Indian railway train
- Nagavali River, India
