= Puri–Ahmedabad Weekly Express =

Train in India

Overview
- Service type: Express
- Locale: Odisha, Chhattisgarh, Maharashtra & Gujarat
- First service: 17 February 1999; 27 years ago
- Current operator: East Coast Railway

Route
- Termini: Puri (PURI); Ahmedabad (ADI)
- Stops: 36
- Distance travelled: 1,996 km (1,240 mi)
- Average journey time: 35 hrs 10 mins
- Service frequency: Weekly
- Train number: 20861 / 20862

On-board services
- Classes: AC 2 tier, AC 3 tier, Sleeper class, General Unreserved
- Seating arrangements: No
- Sleeping arrangements: Yes
- Catering facilities: On-board catering, E-catering
- Observation facilities: Large windows
- Baggage facilities: Available

Technical
- Rolling stock: LHB coach
- Track gauge: 1,676 mm (5 ft 6 in)
- Operating speed: 57 km/h (35 mph) average including halts

The 20861 / 20862 Puri–Ahmedabad Weekly Express is an Express train belonging to East Coast Railway zone that runs between Puri and Ahmedabad Junction in India. It is currently being operated with 18405/18406 train numbers on a weekly basis.

== Service ==
The 18405/Puri–Ahmedabad Express has an average speed of 54 km/h and covers 1995 km in 37h 5m. The 18406/Ahmedabad–Puri Express has an average speed of 52 km/h and covers 1995 km in 38h 10m.

== Route & halts ==
The important halts of the train are:

- Puri
- Khurda Road Junction
- Bhubaneswar
- Talcher
- Sambalpur Junction
- Balangir
- Titlagarh Junction
- Kantabanji
- Khariar Road
- Raipur Junction
- Durg Junction
- Nagpur Junction
- Akola Junction
- Bhusaval Junction
- Jalgaon Junction
- Dondaicha
- Nandurbar
- Surat
- Vadodara Junction
- Ahmedabad Junction

== Coach composition ==
The train has standard LHB rakes with a max speed of 110 kmph. The train consists of 22 coaches:

- 1 AC II Tier
- 3 AC III Tier
- 9 Sleeper coaches
- 1 Pantry car
- 6 General Unreserved
- 2 End-on Generator

== Traction ==
It is hauled by a Visakhapatnam Loco Shed or Vadodara Loco Shed-based WAP-7 electric locomotive on its entire journey.

== Rake sharing ==
The train shares its rake with 12887/12888 Puri–Howrah Express.

== Direction reversal ==
The train reverses its direction twice at;

- Titlagarh Junction and
- Talcher.

== See also ==
- Puri railway station
- Ahmedabad Junction railway station
- Puri–Howrah Express
