= Badmal railway station =

Railway station in Odisha, India

Badmal

General information
- Location: Badmal, Odisha; India
- Coordinates: 20°23′05″N 83°16′18″E
- System: Indian Railways station
- Owner: Ministry of Railways, Indian Railways
- Line: Jharsuguda–Vizianagaram line
- Platforms: 2
- Tracks: 2

Construction
- Structure type: Standard (on ground)
- Parking: No

Other information
- Status: Functioning
- Station code: BUDM
- Zone(s): East Coast Railway
- Division(s): Sambalpur
Location
- Location within India Location within Odisha

Badmal Railway Station is a railway station on the East Coast Railway network in the state of Odisha, India. It serves Ordnance Factory Badmal, Badmal village, Phapsi and other surrounding villages. Its code is BUDM. It has two platforms. Passenger & Express trains halt at Badmal railway station.

== Major trains ==
- Puri–Durg Express
- Sambalpur–Rayagada Intercity Express
- Bilaspur-Titlagarh Passenger
- Junagarh Road-Sambalpur Road Passenger

== See also ==
- Balangir district
