= Gandhidham–Puri Weekly Superfast Express =

Train in India

Overview
- Service type: Superfast Express
- Locale: Odisha, Chhattisgarh, Maharashtra & Gujarat
- First service: 14 November 2011; 14 years ago
- Current operator: Western Railway

Route
- Termini: Gandhidham (GIMB); Puri (PURI)
- Stops: 25
- Distance travelled: 2,285 km (1,420 mi)
- Average journey time: 41 hours 30 minutes
- Service frequency: Weekly
- Train number: 12993 / 12994

On-board services
- Classes: AC 2 Tier, AC 3 Tier, Sleeper class, General unreserved
- Seating arrangements: Yes
- Sleeping arrangements: Yes
- Catering facilities: E-catering, On-board catering
- Observation facilities: Large windows
- Baggage facilities: No
- Other facilities: Below the seats

Technical
- Rolling stock: LHB coach
- Track gauge: 1,676 mm (5 ft 6 in)
- Operating speed: 55 km/h (34 mph) average including halts.

The 12993 / 12994 Gandhidham–Puri Weekly Superfast Express is a superfast express train belonging to Indian Railways that runs between Gandhidham Junction and Puri via Sambalpur.

It is currently being operated with 12993/12994 train numbers on a weekly basis. This train was announced in the 2011 rail budget.

== Coach composition ==
The train has standard LHB rakes with max speed of 130 kmph. The train consists of 19 coaches :

- 1 AC II Tier
- 2 AC III Tier
- 8 Sleeper coaches
- 6 General Unreserved
- 2 Seating cum Luggage rake

== Service ==
- 12993/Gandhidham–Puri Weekly Superfast Express has an average speed of 55 km/h and covers 2285 km in 41 hrs 30 mins.
- 12994/Puri–Gandhidham Weekly Superfast Express has an average speed of 55 km/h and covers 2285 km in 41 hrs 15 mins.

== Route and halts ==
The important halts of the train are:

- Gandhidham Junction
- Ahmedabad Junction
- Vadodara Junction
- Surat
- Nandurbar
- Jalgaon Junction
- Bhusaval Junction
- Wardha Junction
- Nagpur Junction
- Gondia Junction
- Durg Junction
- Raipur Junction
- Khariar Road
- Kantabanji
- Titlagarh Junction
- Sambalpur Junction
- Bhubaneswar
- Khurda Road Junction
- Puri

== Schedule ==
| Train number | Station code | Departure station | Departure time | Departure day | Arrival station | Arrival time | Arrival day |
|---|---|---|---|---|---|---|---|
| 12993 | GIMB | Gandhidham Junction | 22:45 PM | Fri | Puri | 16:15 PM | Sun |
| 12994 | PURI | Puri | 19:45 PM | Mon | Gandhidham Junction | 13:00 PM | Wed |

== Direction reversal ==
Train reverses its direction one time at:

- Titlagarh Junction

== Traction ==
It is hauled by a Visakhapatnam Loco Shed or Vadodara Loco Shed based WAP-7 electric locomotive from Gandhidham to Puri and vice versa.

== See also ==
- Gandhidham–Puri Weekly Express
