= Koraput Junction railway station =

Railway station in Odisha

Koraput Junction
- Koraput station name board

General information
- Location: Koraput, Odisha; India
- Coordinates: 18°47′32″N 82°43′09″E
- Elevation: 870 m (2,854 ft)
- System: Indian Railways junction station
- Lines: Kothavalasa–Kirandul line Koraput–Rayagada link line
- Platforms: 5
- Tracks: 5 ft 6 in (1,676 mm) broad gauge

Construction
- Structure type: Standard (on-ground station)
- Parking: Available

Other information
- Status: Functioning
- Station code: KRPU
- Zone(s): East Coast Railway
- Division(s): Rayagada

History
- Opened: 1963

Services
Preceding station	Indian Railways	Following station
Suku towards ?	East Coast Railway zone Kothavalasa–Kirandul line	Manabar towards ?
Terminus	East Coast Railway zone Koraput–Rayagada link line	Dumuriput towards ?
Location
- Location within Odisha Location within India

Koraput Junction railway station, located in the Indian state of Odisha, serves Koraput town in Koraput district.

== History ==
In 1960, Indian Railway took up three projects: the Kottavalasa–Koraput–Jeypore–Kirandaul line (Dandakaranya Project), the Titlagarh–Bolangir–Jharsuguda Project and the Rourkela–Kiriburu Project. All the three projects taken together were popularly known as the DBK Project or the Dandakaranya Bolangir Kiriburu Project.

The Koraput–Rayagada Rail Link Project was completed on 31 December 1998.

== Trains ==
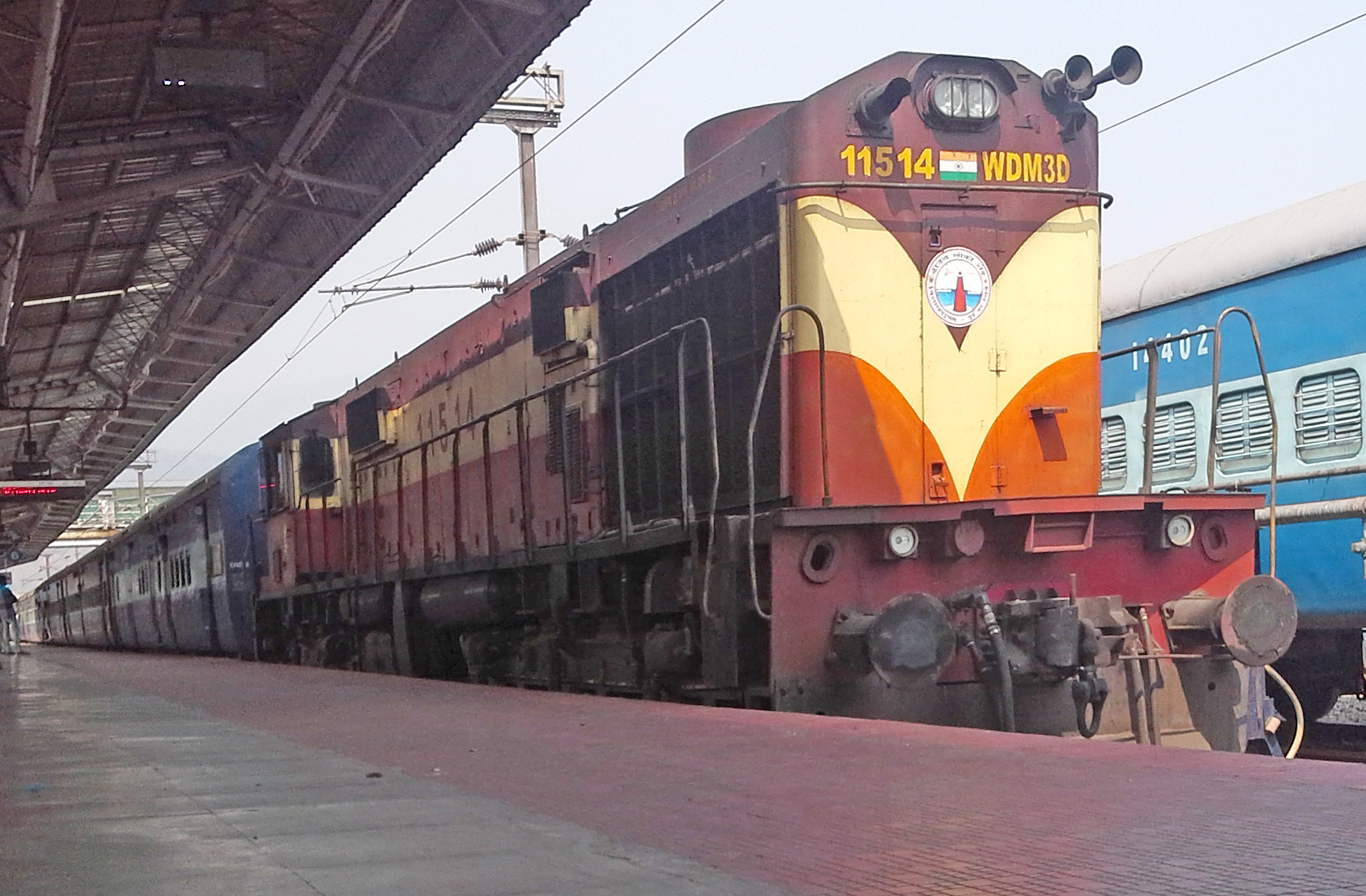
Koraput–Visakhapatnam Intercity express

The Visakhapatnam–Kirandul Passenger passes through Koraput. The Hirakhand Express connects Jagdalpur to Bhubaneswar via Koraput,Rayagada,Vizianagaram and Brahmapur. Howrah–Koraput Samaleshwari Express travels via Jharsuguda, Sambalpur and Rayagada. The Durg–Jagdalpur Tri-Weekly Express travels via Titlagarh, Rayagada and Koraput.

== Passenger movement ==
Koraput railway station serves around 27,000 passengers every day.
