= Ispat Express =

Train in India

Overview
- Service type: Express
- Locale: West Bengal, Jharkhand & Odisha
- First service: 15 August 1976; 50 years ago
- Current operator: South Eastern Railway

Route
- Termini: Howrah (HWH); Titlagarh (TIG) & Kantabanji (KBJ)
- Stops: 22
- Distance travelled: 741 km (460 mi) as 12871/12872; 777 km (483 mi) as 22861/22862
- Average journey time: 14 Hours
- Train numbers: 12871 / 12872; 22861 / 22862

On-board services
- Classes: AC 3 Tier, AC Chair Car, Second Class Seating
- Seating arrangements: Yes
- Sleeping arrangements: Yes
- Auto-rack arrangements: Overhead racks
- Catering facilities: Available
- Observation facilities: Large windows
- Baggage facilities: Available
- Other facilities: Below the seats

Technical
- Rolling stock: LHB coach
- Track gauge: 1,676 mm (5 ft 6 in)
- Operating speed: 130 km/h (81 mph) maximum, 57 km/h (35 mph) average including halts.
Route map
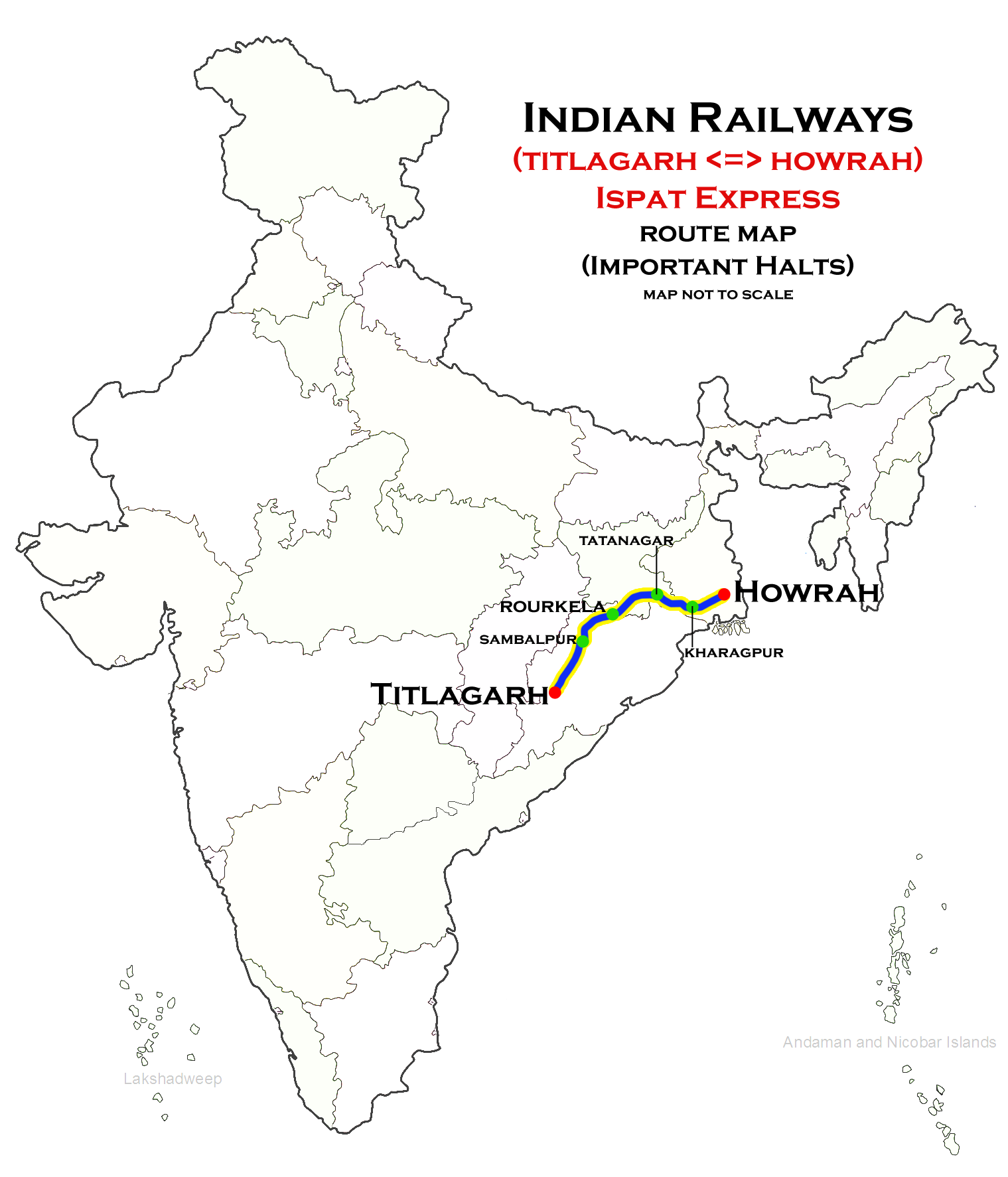

The 12871/12872 & 22861/22862 Ispat Express is a Superfast day train of Indian Railways connecting Kolkata with Titlagarh & Kantabanji. It covers a distance of 741 kilometers at an average speed of 57 km/h (35 mph). It has Two Second Class Unreserved Seating Coaches, 3 AC 3 Tier Coaches, 2 AC Chair Car Coaches and 8 Second Sitting Chair Car Coaches. All of the classes require reservations, except for Second Class Unreserved Seating class, where Tatkal scheme is available. A pantry car is available in this train. Unlike many trains of Indian Railways, it has an advance reservation period of sixty (60) days.

== Traction ==
It is hauled by WAP-7 locomotive from Santragachi electric loco shed on its entire journey.

When it was first opened, it ran from Howrah to Jamshedpur. Later, it was extended to Rourkela, Jharsuguda, Sambalpur and then to Titlagarh. After a fifth change, its destination station was changed from Titlagarh to Kantabanji.

== Rake composition ==
It is running with LHB coach. Advance Reservation Period is of 60 days. Coach composition (18 coaches) is as follows :-

- 1 Seating cum Luggage coach
- 1 Power Generator Car (EOG)
- 2 Unreserved accommodation
- 8 Second Sitting Coaches
- 2 AC Chair Car
- 3 AC Three Tier
- 1 Pantry Car

Loco	1	2	3	4	5	6	7	8	9	10	11	12	13	14	15	16	17	18
	SLRD	GEN	GEN	D1	D2	D3	D4	D5	D6	D7	D8	PC	C1	C2	B1	B2	B3	EOG

== Route and halts ==
- Howrah
- Kharagpur Junction
- Tatanagar Junction
- Chakradharpur
- Rourkela Junction
- Jharsuguda Junction
- Sambalpur Junction
- Bargarh Road
- Balangir Junction
- Kantabanji
- Titlagarh Junction

== Schedule ==
- Train runs daily for both the direction

Train number	Station code	Departure station	Departure time (IST)	Arrival station	Arrival time (IST)	Day
12871	HWH	Howrah	6:35 AM	Titlagarh Junction	7:35 PM	Day 1
12872	TIG	TitlagarDSDWWWE	5:15 AM	Howrah	6:15 PM	Day 1
