= Loisingha railway station =

Railway station in Odisha, India

Loisingha

General information
- Location: Loisingha, Odisha; India
- Coordinates: 20°51′14″N 83°30′50″E
- System: Indian Railways station
- Owner: Ministry of Railways, Indian Railways
- Line: Jharsuguda–Vizianagaram line
- Platforms: 2
- Tracks: 4

Construction
- Structure type: Standard (on ground)
- Parking: Yes (2 wheeler paid parking)

Other information
- Status: Functioning
- Station code: LSX
- Zone(s): East Coast Railway
- Division(s): Sambalpur
Location
- Location within India Location within Odisha

Loisingha railway station is a railway station on the East Coast Railway network in the state of Odisha, India. It serves Loisingha town. Its code is LSX. It has two platforms. Passenger, Express and Superfast trains halt at Loisingha railway station.

== Major trains ==
- Ispat Express
- Sambalpur–Rayagada Intercity Express
- Puri-Durg Express
- Bhubaneswar–Bolangir Intercity Superfast Express
- The Samaleswari Express is an Indian express train (18005/18006) that runs daily between Howrah Junction (HWH) and Jagdalpur (JDB).

== See also ==
- Balangir district
