= Dharti Aaba AC Superfast Express =

Train in India

Overview
- Service type: AC Express
- First service: 27 October 2016; 9 years ago
- Current operator: South Eastern Railway

Route
- Termini: Hatia (HTE); Ernakulam (ERS)
- Stops: 28
- Distance travelled: 2,245 km (1,395 mi)
- Average journey time: 45 hrs 55 mins
- Service frequency: Weekly.
- Train number: 22837 / 22838

On-board services
- Class: 18 AC 3 tier Economy
- Seating arrangements: Yes
- Sleeping arrangements: Yes
- Catering facilities: Available
- Observation facilities: Large windows
- Entertainment facilities: Reading lamps
- Baggage facilities: Available
- Other facilities: Below the seats

Technical
- Rolling stock: LHB coach
- Track gauge: 1,676 mm (5 ft 6 in)
- Operating speed: 130 km/h (81 mph) maximum, 57 km/h (35 mph) average including halts

The 22837 / 22838 Dharti Aaba AC Superfast Express is a Superfast Express train of the AC Express series belonging to Indian Railways – South Eastern Railway zone that runs between Hatia and Ernakulam Junction in India.

It operates as train number 22837 from Hatia to Ernakulam Junction and as train number 22838 in the reverse direction, serving the states of Jharkhand, Odisha, Andhra Pradesh, Tamil Nadu and Kerala.

== Coaches ==
The Train Rake has LHB coach.The Train has 18 Coaches with the following composition:

- 17 3E coaches.
- 1 Pantry Car

== Service ==
The 22837 Hatia–Ernakulam Junction Dharti Aaba AC Superfast Express covers the distance of 2,254 km (1,401 mi) in 40 hours 40 mins (55.00 km/h) and in 40 hours 45 mins as 22838 Ernakulam Junction–Hatia Dharti Aaba AC Superfast Express (55.00 km/h).

As the average speed of the train is above 55 km/h (34 mph), as per Indian Railways rules, its fare includes a Superfast surcharge.

== Route & halts ==
- Hatia
- Rourkela
- Jharsuguda
- Sambalpur
- Bargarh
- Balangir
- Titlagarh Junction
- Kesinga
- Muniguda
- Rayagada
- Parvatipuram
- Bobbili Junction
- Vizianagaram Junction
- Visakhapatnam Junction
- Samalkot
- Rajahmundry
- Eluru
- Vijayawada Junction
- Ongole
- Nellore
- Renigunta
- Katpadi Junction
- Salem Junction
- Erode Junction
- Coimbatore Junction
- Palakkad Junction
- Thrissur
- Aluva
- Ernakulam Junction

== Traction ==
It is hauled by a Tatanagar Loco Shed based WAP-7 electric Locomotive from Hatia to Visakhapatnam and from Visakhapatnam to Ernakulam it is hauled by a Royapuram Loco Shed based WAP-7 electric locomotive on its reminder journey.

== Operation ==
- 22837 Hatia–Ernakulam Junction Dharti Aaba AC Superfast Express leaves Hatia every Monday and arrives Ernakulam Junction on third day.
- 22838 Ernakulam Junction–Hatia Dharti Aaba AC Superfast Express leaves Ernakulam Junction every Thursday and arrives Hatia on second day.
