= Tambaram–Jasidih Weekly Superfast Express =

Passenger train in India

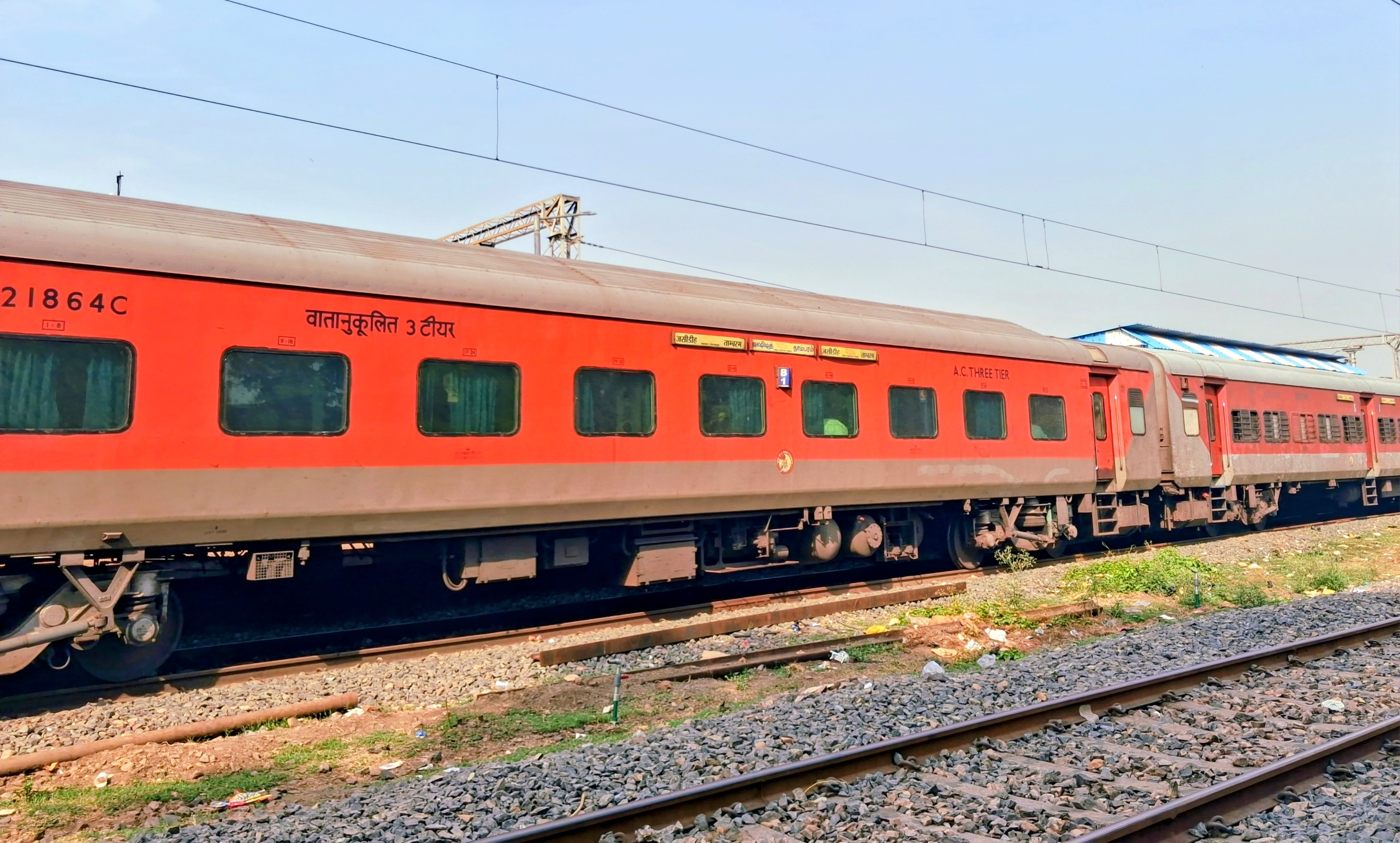
- Jasidih-Tambaram Weekly SF Express at Madhupur Junction

Overview
- Service type: Superfast
- First service: 4 August 2012; 14 years ago
- Current operator: Eastern Railways

Route
- Termini: Tambaram (TBM); Jasidih Junction (JSME)
- Stops: 28
- Distance travelled: 1,872 km (1,163 mi)
- Average journey time: 34 hours 45 minutes
- Service frequency: Weekly
- Train number: 12375/12376

On-board services
- Classes: AC 2 Tier, AC 3 Tier, Sleeper Class, General Unreserved
- Seating arrangements: Yes
- Sleeping arrangements: Yes
- Catering facilities: Pantry car On-board catering and e-catering
- Baggage facilities: Below the Seats

Technical
- Rolling stock: LHB coach
- Track gauge: 1,676 mm (5 ft 6 in)
- Operating speed: 58 km/h (36 mph)

The 12375/12376 Tambaram–Jasidih Junction Ratna Weekly Superfast Express (formerly Chennai Central–Asansol Ratna Express) is an express train of the Indian Railways connecting Chennai Tambaram in Tamil Nadu and Jasidih Junction in Jharkhand. It is currently being operated with 12375/12376 train numbers on a weekly basis.

== Service ==
The 12375/Tambaram–Jasidih Junction Ratna Weekly Express has an average speed of 56 km/h and covers 1872 km in 33 hrs 25 mins. 12376/Jasidih Junction–Tambaram Ratna Weekly Express has an average speed of 54 km/h and covers 1872 km in 34 hrs 45 mins.

== Route and halts ==
The important halts of the train are:

- Tambaram
- Chennai Egmore
- Vijayawada Junction
- Eluru
- Visakhapatnam Junction
- Vizianagaram Junction
- Rayagada
- Titlagarh Junction
- Sambalpur Junction
- Jharsuguda Junction
- Rourkela Junction
- Chakradharpur
- Joychandi Pahar (Adra alternative)
- Asansol Junction
- Chittaranjan
- Madhupur Junction
- Jasidih Junction

== Coach composition ==
The train has newly manufacturef LHB rakes with max speed of 110 kmph. The train consists of 22 coaches :

- 1 AC II Tier
- 6 AC III Tier
- 10 Sleeper Coaches
- 2 General Unreserved
- 1 Pantry Car
- 2 End On Generator Cars (EOG)

== Traction ==
Both trains are hauled by an Erode shed-based WAP-4 electric locomotive from Tambaram to Visakhapatnam, from Visakhapatnam it is hauled by a Tatanagar shed based WAP-7 locomotive up to Asansol and from Asansol to Jasidih by a Howrah shed based WAP-7 locomotive and vice versa.

== Direction reversal ==
The train reverses its direction 1 times:

- Visakhapatnam Junction
- Asansol Junction

== See also ==
- Tambaram railway station
- Jasidih Junction railway station
