= Puri–Howrah Express =

Puri Howrah Express
Overview
- Service type: Superfast Express
- Current operator: South Eastern Railways

Route
- Termini: Puri; Howrah Junction
- Stops: 9
- Distance travelled: 502 km (312 mi)
- Average journey time: 08 hours 30 mins in both ways
- Service frequency: Everyday
- Train number: 12837 / 12838

On-board services
- Classes: AC First Class, AC 2 tier, AC 3 tier, AC 3 tier Economy, Sleeper class, Unreserved
- Seating arrangements: Yes
- Sleeping arrangements: Yes
- Catering facilities: No

Technical
- Rolling stock: LHB coaches
- Track gauge: 1,676 mm (5 ft 6 in)
- Electrification: Yes
- Operating speed: 130 km/h (81 mph) maximum, 59 km/h (37 mph), including halts

The 12837 / 38 Howrah–Puri Express is a Superfast Express train belonging to Indian Railways – South Eastern Railway zone that runs between Howrah Junction and Puri in India.

It operates as train number 12837 from Howrah Junction to Puri and as train number 12838 in the reverse direction, serving the states of West Bengal and Odisha.

== Coaches ==
The 12837 Howrah–Puri Express has the following coach composition

- 1 SLR
- 2 Unreserved
- 8 Sleeper Class (Sometimes an extra is added)
- 2 AC 3 tier Econony
- 5 AC 3 tier
- 2 AC 2 tier
- 1 AC First Class
- 1 Generator Car

12838 runs with the exact reverse coach composition.

== Service ==
The 12837 Howrah–Puri Express covers the distance of 502 km (312 mi) in 9 hours (59 km/h). It departs Howrah from the new complex (PF 16–23)at 10:35 PM and arrives Puri the next day at 07:30 AM

12838 departs Puri at 08:15 PM and arrives Howrah at 05:15 AM taking almost same time. .

As the average speed of the train is above 55 km/h (34 mph), as per Indian Railways rules, its fare includes a Superfast surcharge.

== Routeing ==
The 12837 / 38 Howrah–Puri Express runs from Howrah Junction via Kharagpur Junction, Balasore, Cuttack, Bhubaneswar to Puri .

== Traction ==
As the route is fully electrified, a Santragachi-based WAP-7 powers the train for its entire journey.
