= Nagavali Express =

Train in India

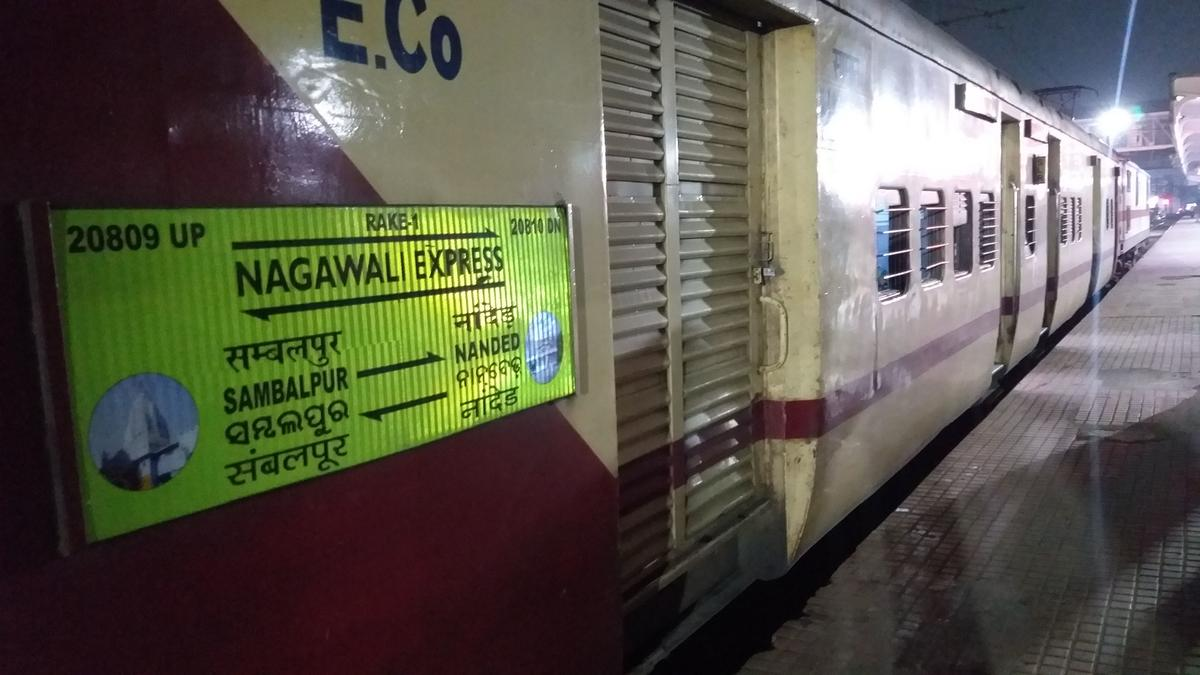
- Nagavali Express at Charlapalli.

Overview
- Service type: Express
- Locale: Odisha, Andhra Pradesh, Telangana & Maharashtra
- First service: 23 March 2003; 23 years ago
- Current operator: East Coast Railway

Route
- Termini: Sambalpur (SBP); Hazur Sahib Nanded (NED)
- Stops: 20
- Distance travelled: 1,480 km (920 mi)
- Average journey time: 26 hours 55 minutes
- Service frequency: Tri-Weekly

On-board services
- Classes: AC 2 Tier, AC 3 Tier, Sleeper Class, General Unreserved
- Seating arrangements: Yes
- Sleeping arrangements: Yes
- Catering facilities: Available
- Observation facilities: Large windows
- Baggage facilities: No
- Other facilities: Below the seats

Technical
- Rolling stock: ICF coach
- Track gauge: Broad Gauge (1,676 mm)
- Operating speed: 55 km/h (34 mph) average including halts.
Route map
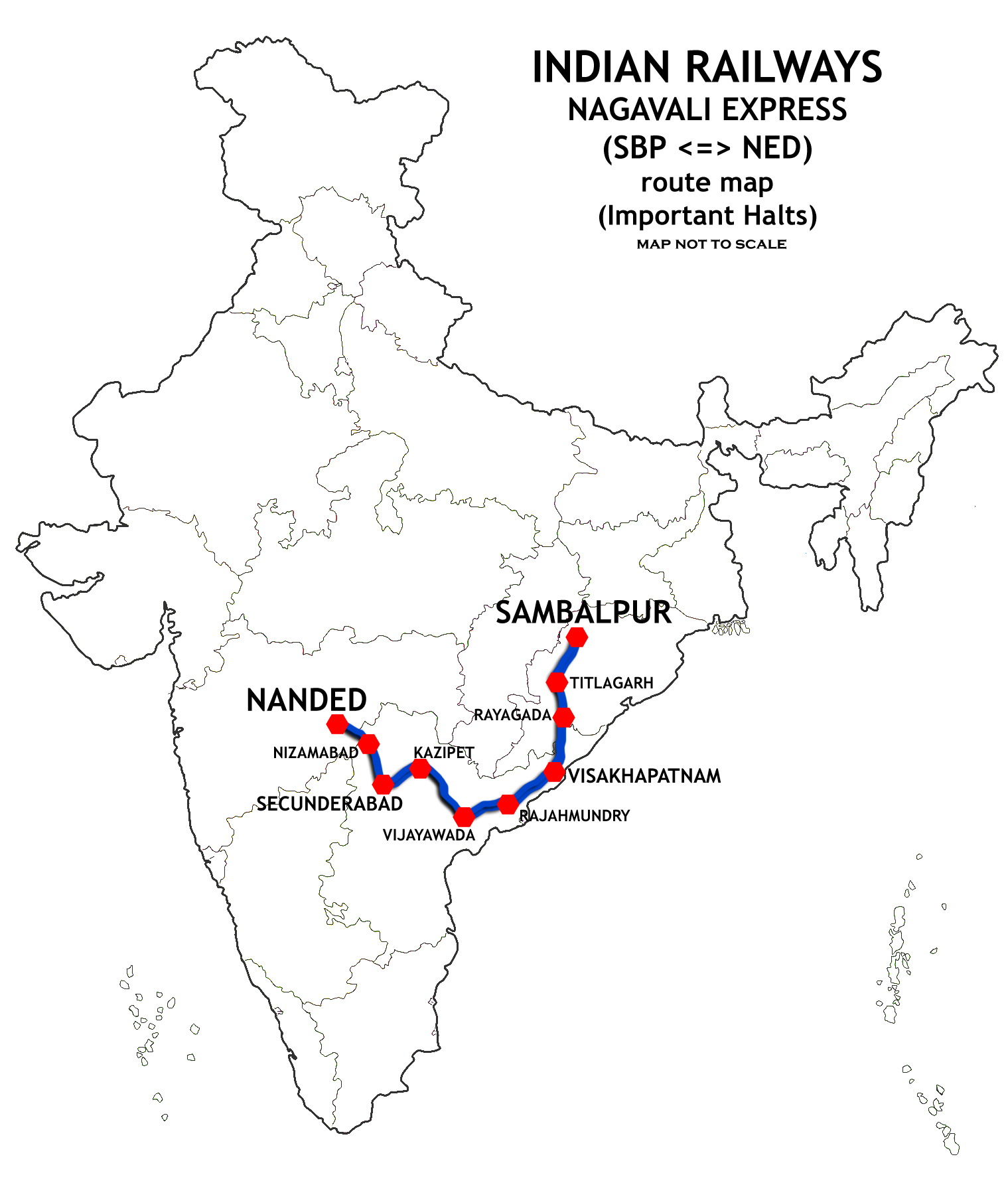

The Nagavali Express or Nagawali Express belongs to the East Coast Railway zone which was named after Nagavali River. It runs between Sambalpur and Nanded as a bi-weekly express train. The train first ran between Sambalpur and Nizamabad on 23 March 2003. The train was later extended from Nizamabad to Hazur Sahib Nanded. The frequency was increased from bi-weekly to tri-weekly in the 2013 rail budget. It was named after the Nagavali River.

== Service ==
It serves the states of Odisha, Andhra Pradesh, Telangana and Maharashtra. It has 19 halts on its way. It starts from Sambalpur on Sunday, Monday and Friday at 10:50 and reaches Hazur Sahib Nanded on Monday, Tuesday and Saturday at 13:45. The train from Sambalpur to Nanded is numbered as 20809 and from Nanded to Sambalpur as 20810.

== Locomotives ==
It is hauled by WAP-7 electric locomotive of Visakhapatnam Loco Shed from Sambalpur to Visakhapatnam, from Visakhapatnam to Hazur Sahib Nanded it is hauled by a WAP-7 of Lallaguda Loco Shed .

== Time table ==
20809- Sambalpur to Hazur Sahib Nanded

Station code	Station name	Arrival	Departure
SBP	Sambalpur Jn.	Source	09:30
BRGA	Bargarh Road	10:10	10:12
BLGR	Balangir	11:10	11:15
TIG	Titlagarh Jn.	12:35	12:45
KSNG	Kesinga	12:58	13:00
MNGD	Muniguda	14:15	14:17
RGDA	Rayagada	15:40	15:45
PVPT	Parvatipuram Town	16:32	16:34
VBL	Bobbili Jn.	16:58	17:00
GPI	Gajapathinagaram	17:25	17:27
VZM	Vizianagaram Jn.	17:50	17:55
VSKP	Visakhapatnam Jn.	19:10	19:30
RJY	Rajahmundry	22:40	22:42
EE	Eluru	23:47	23:48
BZA	Vijayawada Jn.	01:30	01:50
KZJ	Kazipet Jn.	06:00	06:02
CHZ	Charlapalli railway station	09:00	09:20
KMC	Kamareddi	10:55	10:57
NZB	Nizamabad	11:55	11:57
BSX	Basar	12:44	12:45
MEU	Mudkhed Jn	13:45	13:47
NED	Hazur Sahib Nanded	14:35	Destination

20810- Hazur Sahib Nanded to Sambalpur

Station code	Station name	Arrival	Departure
NED	Hazur Sahib Nanded	Source	16:15
MEU	Mudkhed Jn.	16:43	16:45
BSX	Basar	17:50	17:51
NZB	Nizamabad	18:10	18:15
KMC	Kamareddi	18:54	18:55
CHZ	Charlapalli railway station	21:10	21:30
KZJ	Kazipet Jn.	23:35	23:37
BZA	Vijayawada Jn.	03:35	03:55
EE	Eluru	04:41	04:42
RJY	Rajahmundry	06:15	06:17
VSKP	Visakhapatnam Jn.	10:15	10:35
VZM	Vizianagaram Jn.	11:30	11:35
GPI	Gajapathinagaram	11:56	11:58
VBL	Bobbili Jn.	12:30	12:32
PVPT	Parvatipuram Town	12:48	12:50
RGDA	Rayagada	13:30	13:45
MNGD	Muniguda	14:43	14:45
KSNG	Kesinga	15:40	15:42
TIG	Titlagarh Jn.	16:10	16:20
BLGR	Balangir	17:10	17:15
BRGA	Bargarh Road	18:30	18:32
SBP	Sambalpur Jn.	19:50	Destination

== Gallery ==
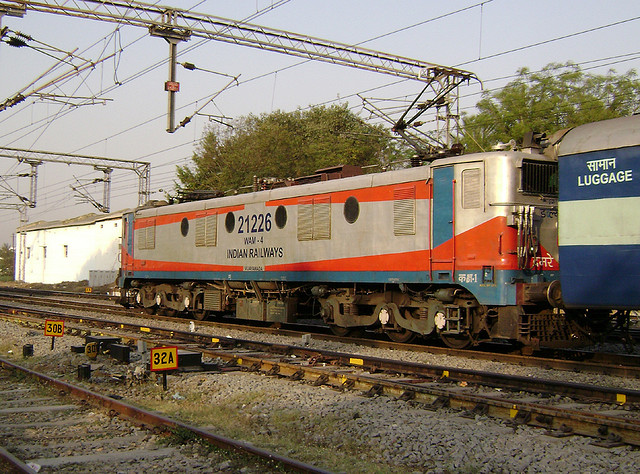
20809 (SBP-NED) Nagavali Express at Moulaali with a WAM-4 Loco

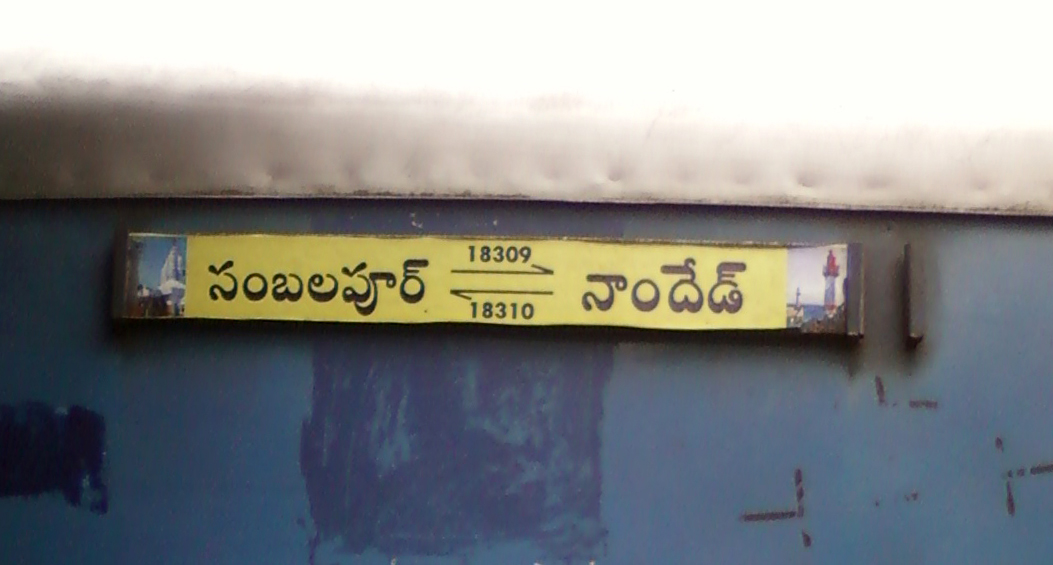
Nagavali Express name-board in Telugu language

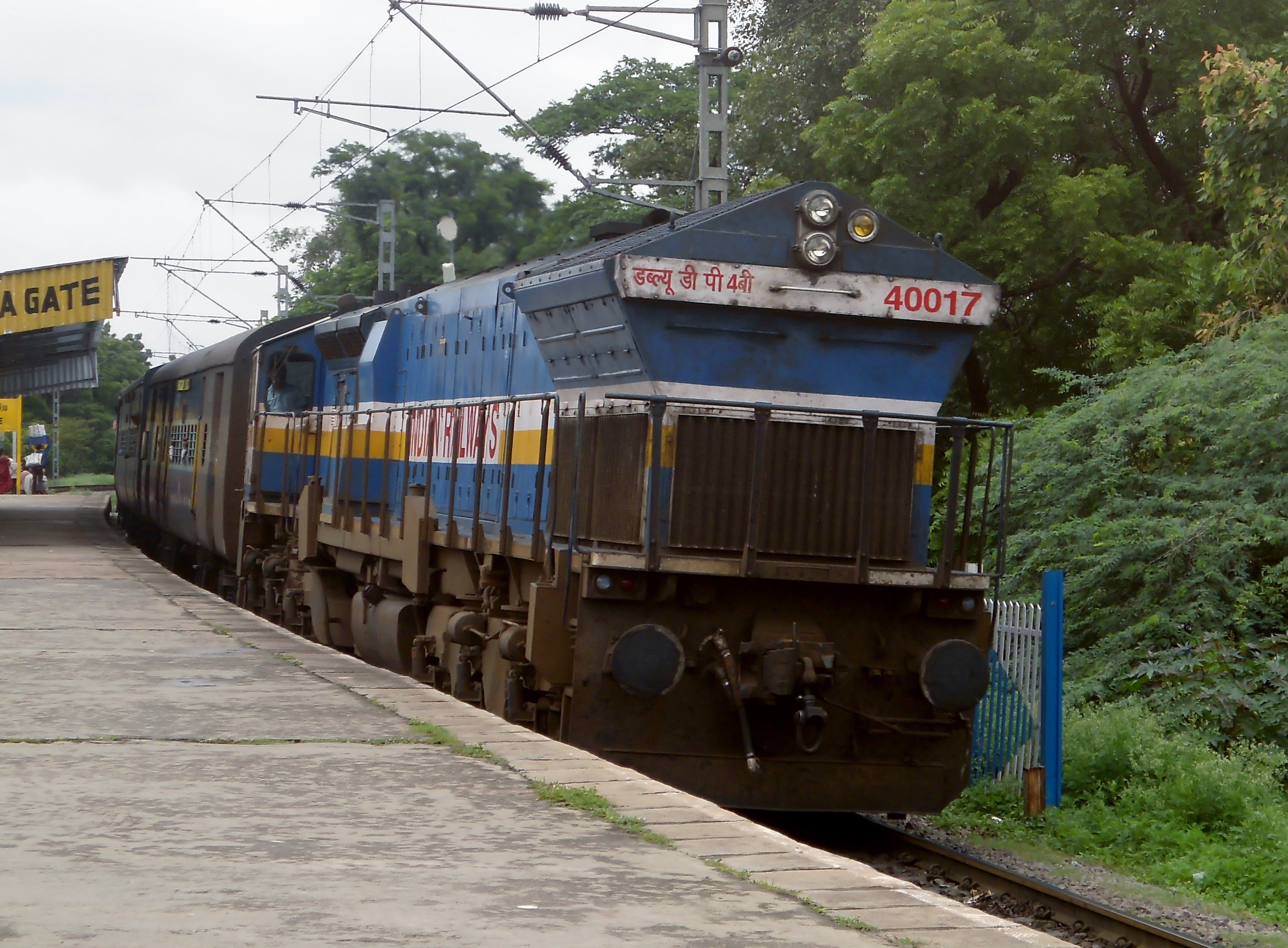
20809 (SBP-NED) Nagavali Express at Lallaguda with a WDP-4 loco

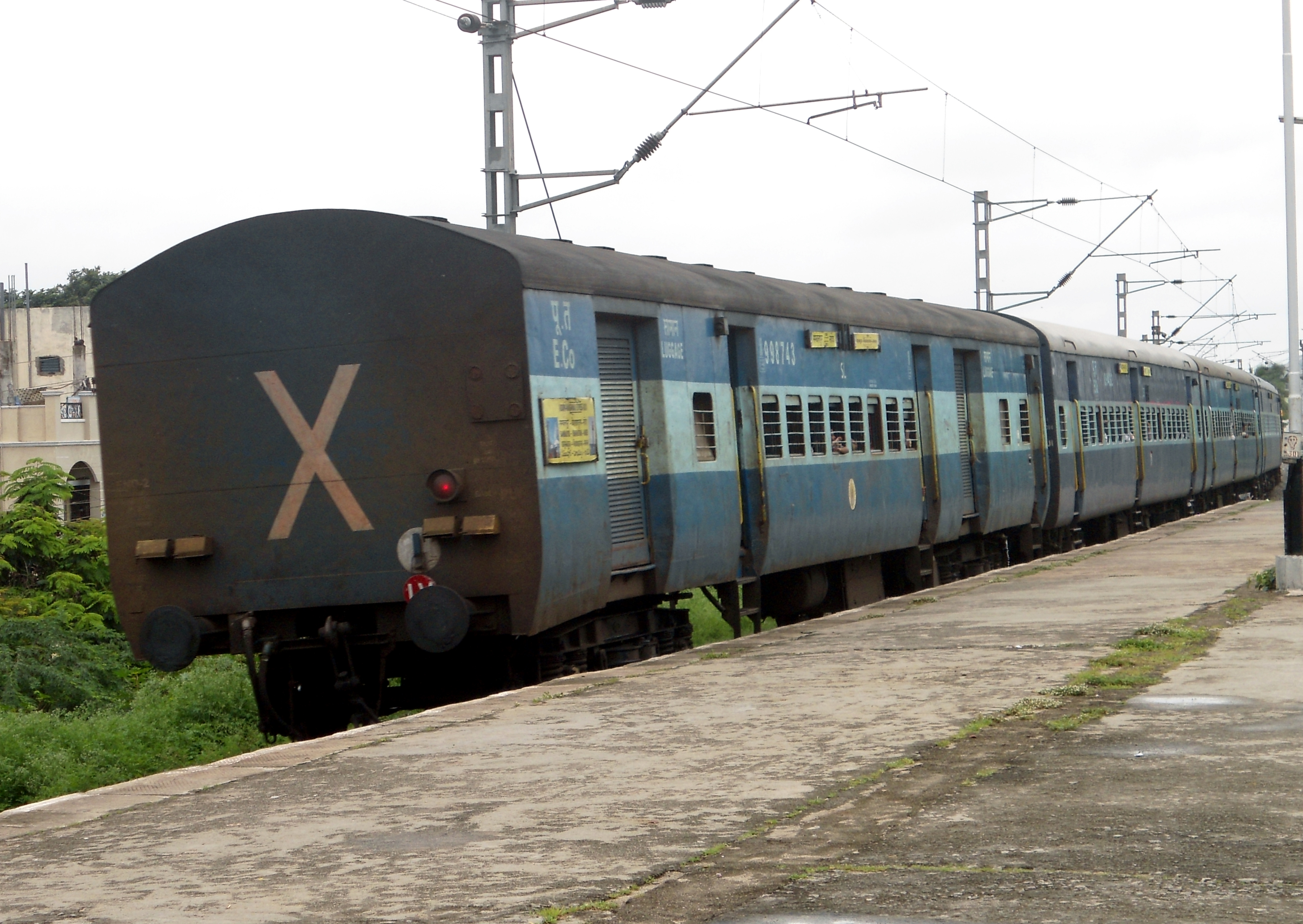
20809 (SBP-NED) Nagavali Express crossing Lallaguda
