= Gandhidham–Puri Weekly Express =

Train in India

Overview
- Service type: Express
- Locale: Gujarat, Maharastra, Chhattisgarh & Andhra Pradesh
- First service: 8 October 2014; 10 years ago
- Current operator(s): Western Railway

Route
- Termini: Gandhidham (GIMB); Puri (PURI)
- Stops: 37
- Distance travelled: 2,435 km (1,513 mi)
- Average journey time: 44 hours
- Service frequency: Weekly
- Train number(s): 22973 / 22974

On-board services
- Class(es): AC 2 Tier, AC 3 Tier, Sleepar Class, General Unreserved
- Disabled access: Disabled access
- Seating arrangements: Yes
- Sleeping arrangements: Yes
- Catering facilities: Available
- Observation facilities: Large windows
- Baggage facilities: No
- Other facilities: Below the seats

Technical
- Rolling stock: LHB coach
- Track gauge: 1,676 mm (5 ft 6 in)
- Operating speed: 55 km/h (34 mph) average including halts.
Route map
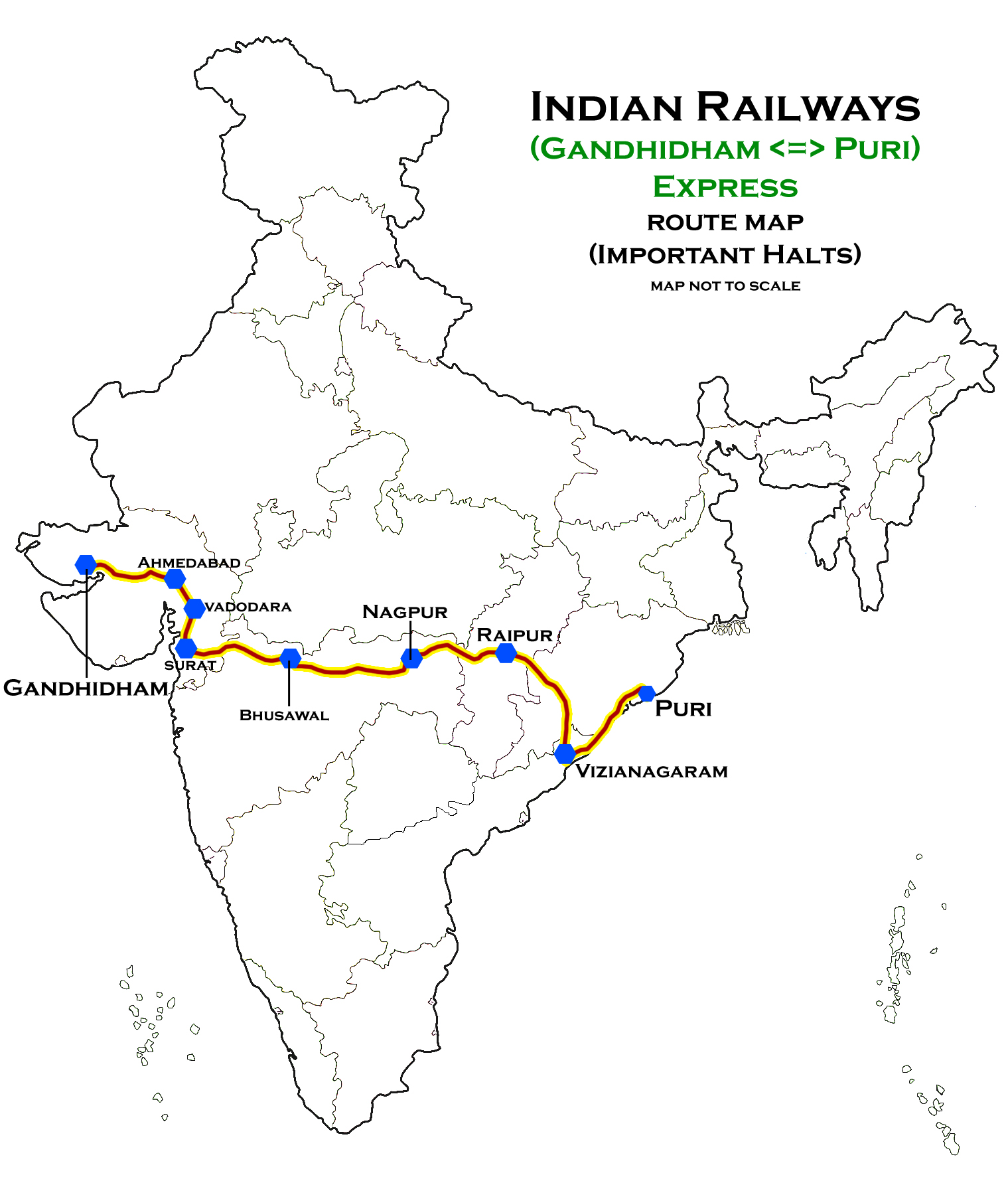

The 22973 / 22974 Gandhidham–Puri Weekly Express is an Express train of Indian Railways that runs between Gandhidham Junction and Puri via Vizianagaram.

It is currently being operated with 22973/22974 train numbers which runs once in a week.

== Coach composition ==
The train has standard LHB rakes with max speed of 130 kmph. The train consists of 20 coaches.

- 1 AC II Tier
- 2 AC III Tier
- 7 Sleeper Coaches
- 7 General Unreserved
- 2 Seating cum Luggage Rake
- 1 High Capacity Parcel

Loco	1	2	3	4	5	6	7	8	9	10	11	12	13	14	15	16	17	18	19	20
	SLR	UR	UR	UR	UR	S7	S6	S5	S4	S3	S2	S1	B2	B1	A1	UR	UR	UR	EoG	HCP

== Route and halts ==
The important halts of the train are:

- Gandhidham Junction
- Ahmedabad Junction
- Vadodara Junction
- Jalgaon Junction
- Bhusaval Junction
- Akola Junction
- Badnera Junction
- Wardha Junction
- Nagpur Junction
- Durg Junction
- Raipur Junction
- Titlagarh Junction
- Vizianagaram Junction
- Khurda Road Junction
- Puri

== Traction ==
It is hauled by a Vadodara Loco Shed or Visakhapatnam Loco Shed based WAP-7 electric locomotive on its entire journey.
