= Puri–Ahmedabad Express =

Train in India

Overview
- Service type: Superfast Express
- Locale: Odisha, Andhra Pradesh, Chhattisgarh, Maharashtra & Gujarat
- Current operator: East Coast Railway

Route
- Termini: Puri (PURI); Ahmedabad (ADI)
- Stops: 44
- Distance travelled: 2,135 km (1,327 mi)
- Average journey time: 37 hours 05 minutes
- Service frequency: 4 days a week.
- Train number: 12843 / 12844

On-board services
- Classes: AC 2 tier, AC 3 tier, Sleeper class, General Unreserved
- Seating arrangements: Yes
- Sleeping arrangements: Yes
- Catering facilities: Available
- Observation facilities: Large windows
- Baggage facilities: Available
- Other facilities: Below the seats

Technical
- Rolling stock: LHB coach
- Track gauge: 1,676 mm (5 ft 6 in)
- Operating speed: 130 km/h (81 mph) maximum, 58 km/h (36 mph) average including halts
Route map
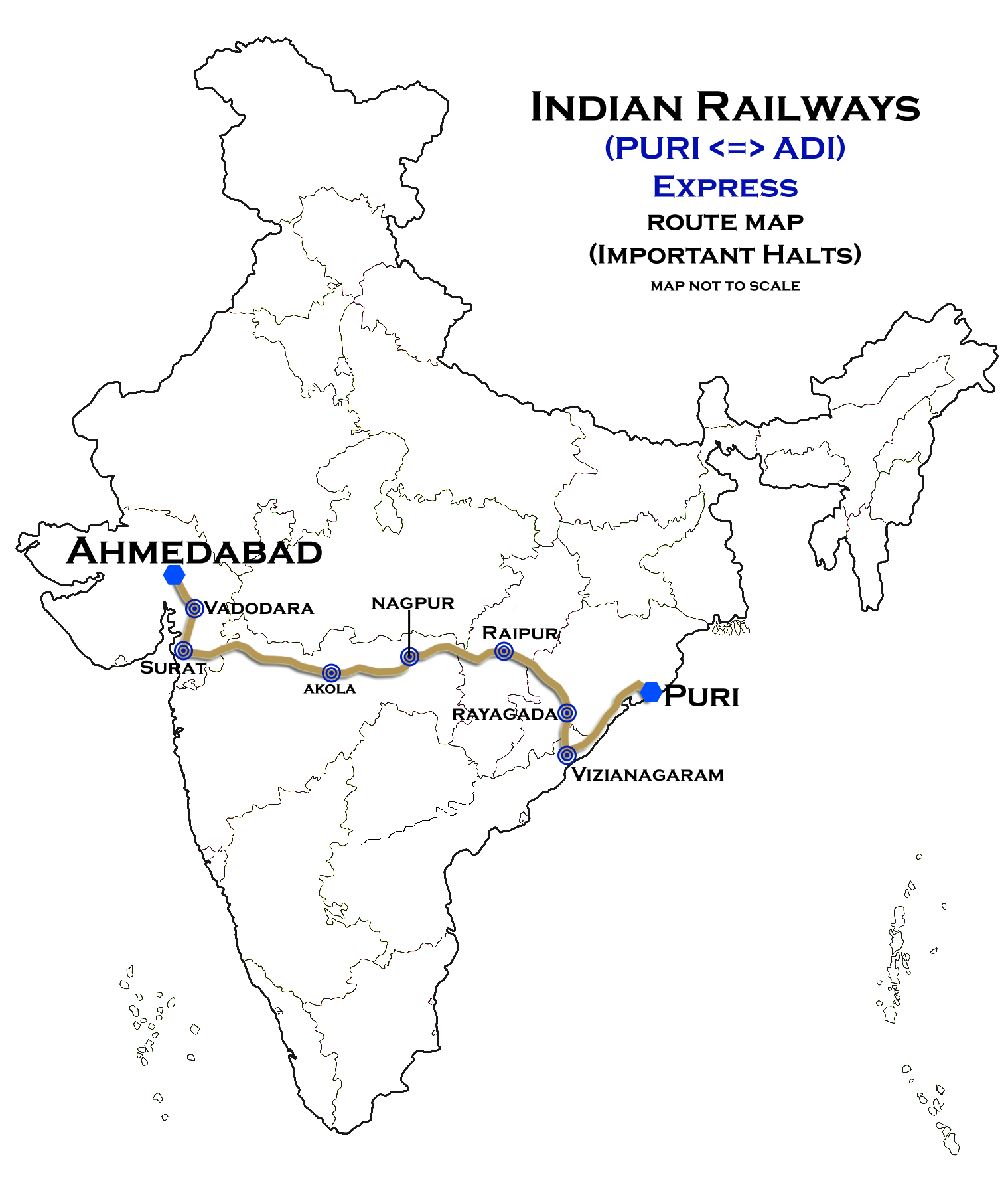

The 12843 / 12844 Puri–Ahmedabad Express is a Superfast Express train of Indian Railways – East Coast Railways zone that runs between Puri and Ahmedabad Junction in India.

It operates as train number 12843 from Puri to Ahmedabad Junction and as train number 12844 in the reverse direction, serving the states of Odisha, Andhra Pradesh, Chhattisgarh, Maharashtra & Gujarat.

== Coaches ==
The 12843/44 Puri–Ahmedabad Express presently has 1 AC 2 tier, 5 AC 3 tier, 8 Sleeper class, 5 Second Class seating coaches.

As with most train services in India, coach composition may be amended at the discretion of Indian Railways depending on demand.

== Service ==
The 12843/44 Puri–Ahmedabad Express covers the distance of 2137 kilometres in 37 hours 55 mins as 12843 Puri–Ahmedabad Express (56.18 km/h) and in 38 hrs 55 mins as 12844 Ahmedabad–Puri Express (54.73 km/h).

As the average speed of the train is above 55 km/h, as per Indian Railways rules, its fare includes a Superfast surcharge.

== Route and halts ==
The 12843/44 Puri–Ahmedabad Express runs via Khurda Road Junction, Vizianagaram Junction, Raipur Junction, Durg, Nagpur Junction, Wardha Junction, Nandura, Bhusaval Junction, Nandurbar, Surat, Vadodara Junction to Ahmedabad Junction.

== Direction reversal ==
The train reverses its direction twice at;

- Khurda Road Junction and
- Vizianagaram Junction.

== Traction ==
This route is fully electrified and it is hauled by a Visakhapatnam Loco Shed or Vadodara Loco Shed-based WAP-7 electric locomotive on its entire journey.

== Timings ==
- 12843 Puri–Ahmedabad Express leaves Puri every Tuesday, Thursday, Friday & Saturday at 17:30 hrs IST and reaches Ahmedabad Junction at 07:25 hrs IST on the 3rd day.
- 12844 Ahmedabad–Puri Express leaves Ahmedabad Junction every Monday, Thursday, Saturday & Sunday at 18:40 hrs IST and reaches Puri at 08:55 hrs IST on the 3rd day.
