= Jagdalpur railway station =

Railway station in Chhattisgarh in Bastar district

Jagdalpur

General information
- Location: National Highway 63, Jagdalpur, Chhattisgarh; India
- Coordinates: 19.0661°N 82.0141°E
- Elevation: 570 metres (1,870 ft)
- System: Indian Railways station
- Owner: Indian Railways
- Operator: East Coastal Railway
- Lines: Jagdalpur–Raipur line Kirandul–Jagdalpur line Dalli Rajhara–Jagdalpur line (Under Construction)
- Platforms: 3
- Tracks: 4
- Connections: Auto stand

Construction
- Structure type: Standard (on ground station)
- Parking: Yes
- Cycle facilities: Yes

Other information
- Status: Functioning (construction – new line)
- Station code: JDB
- Zone(s): East Coast Railway
- Division(s): Waltair railway division
Location

Jagdalpur railway station is a railway station located in Bastar district, Chhattisgarh which serves the city of Jagdalpur. Its code is JDB. The station consists of three platforms and is well sheltered. It lacks water and sanitation facilities.

During the year of 2015, only twenty-seven platform tickets were sold at the Jagdalpur station, the worst in Indian Railways history. That is because only 4 trains run from Jagdalpur railway station.
