= Puri–Durg Express =

Train in India

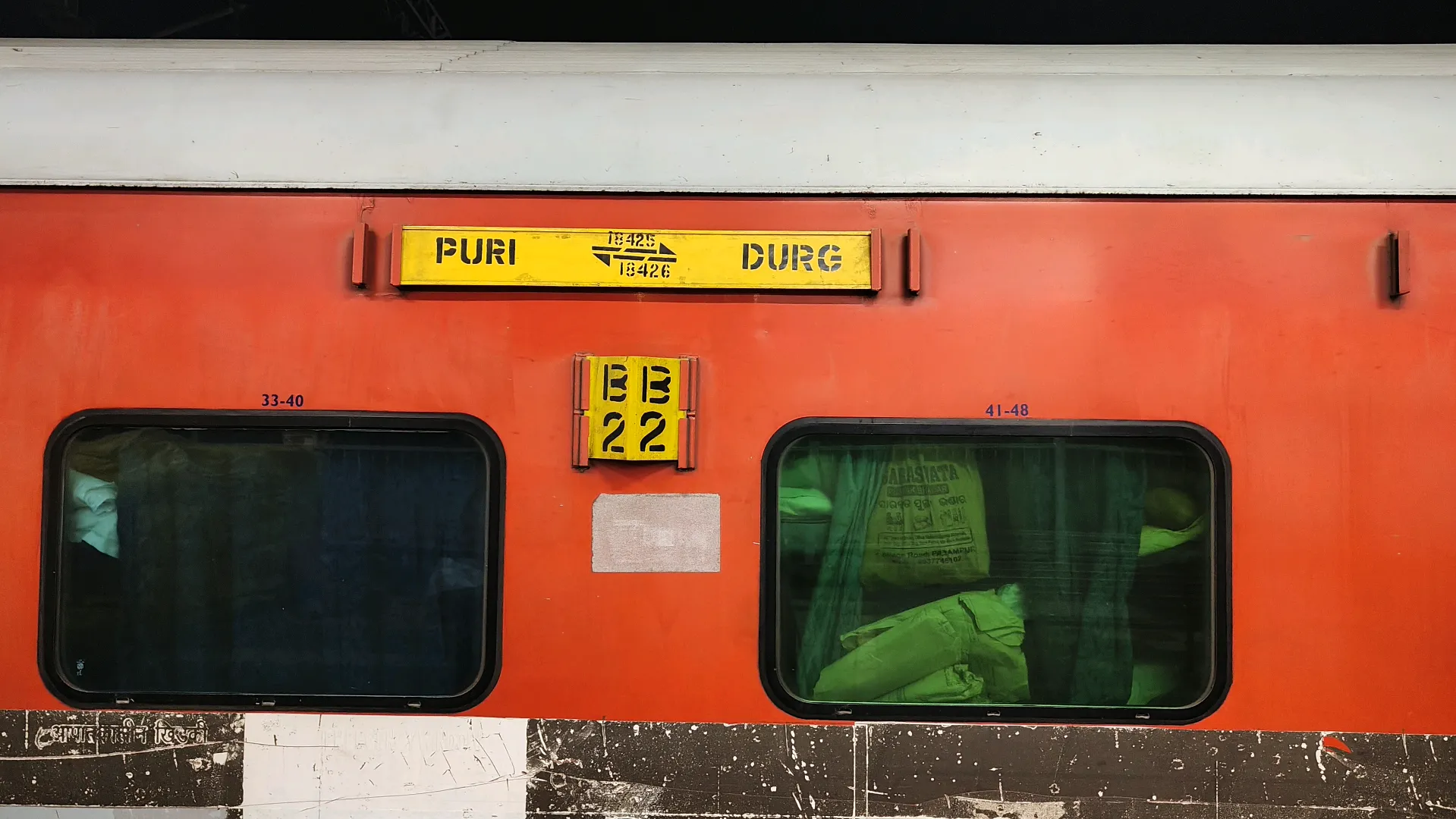
- Puri–Durg Express At Cuttack Junction

Overview
- Service type: Express
- Locale: Chhattisgarh & Odisha
- First service: 2006; 20 years ago
- Current operator: East Coast Railway

Route
- Termini: Durg (DURG); Puri (PURI)
- Stops: 27
- Distance travelled: 797 km (495 mi)
- Average journey time: 16 hours 45 minutes
- Service frequency: Daily (Note: Runs seven day in a week for every direction.)
- Train number: 18425 / 18426

On-board services
- Classes: AC First Class, AC 2 Tier, AC 3 Tier, Sleeper Class, General Unreserved
- Seating arrangements: No
- Sleeping arrangements: Yes
- Catering facilities: On-board catering, E-catering
- Observation facilities: Large windows
- Baggage facilities: No
- Other facilities: Below the seats

Technical
- Rolling stock: LHB coach
- Track gauge: 1,676 mm (5 ft 6 in)
- Operating speed: 48 km/h (30 mph) average including halts.

The 18425 / 18426 Puri–Durg Express is an express train belonging to East Coast Railway zone that runs between Durg Junction and Puri in India. It is currently being operated with 18425/18426 train numbers on a daily basis. This train was introduced as Bhubaneswar–Raipur express in 2006. In 2010 it was extended to Puri and Durg.

== Service ==
- The 18425/Puri–Durg Express has an average speed of 46 km/h and covers 797 km in 17h 10m.
- The 18426/Durg–Puri Express has an average speed of 47 km/h and covers 797 km in 17h.

== Route and halts ==
The important halts of the train are:

- Puri
- Khurda Road Junction
- Bhubaneswar
- Cuttack
- Dhenkanal
- Meramandali
- Talcher
- Angul
- Sambalpur Junction
- Bargarh Road
- Balangir
- Titlagarh Junction
- Kantabanji
- Mahasamund
- Raipur Junction
- Durg Junction

== Coach composition ==
The train has standard LHB rakes with a max speed of 110 kmph. The train consists of 20 coaches:

- 1 First AC
- 2 AC II Tier
- 2 AC III Tier
- 8 Sleeper coaches
- 5 General Unreserved
- 2 Seating cum Luggage Rake

== Traction ==
Both trains are hauled by a Visakhapatnam Loco Shed-based WAP-7 electric locomotive from Durg to Puri.

== Direction reversal ==
The train reverses its direction 2 times:

- Titlagarh Junction
- Talcher

== See also ==
- Durg Junction railway station
- Puri railway station
