= Lokmanya Tilak Terminus–Puri Superfast Express =

Express train

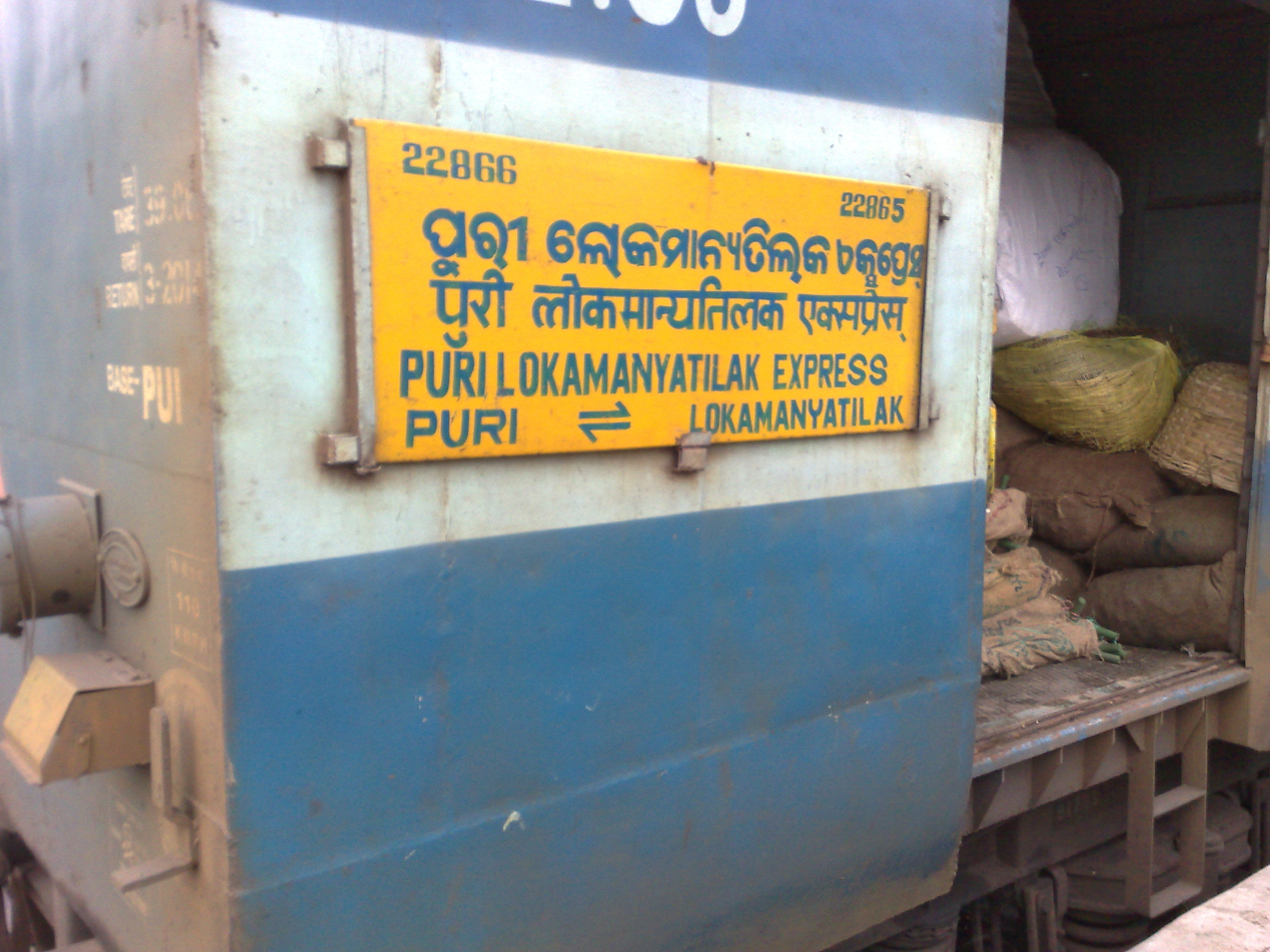

Overview
- Service type: Superfast Express
- Locale: Orissa, Chhattisgarh, Maharashtra
- First service: 6 April 2010
- Current operator: East Coast Railway

Route
- Termini: Puri; Lokmanya Tilak Terminus
- Stops: 14
- Distance travelled: 1,851 km (1,150 mi)
- Average journey time: 32 hours 05 minutes as 22866 Puri Lokmanya Tilak Terminus Express, 32 hours 50 minutes as 22865 Lokmanya Tilak Terminus Express
- Service frequency: 1 day a week. 22866 – Tuesday, 22865 – Thursday
- Train number: 22865 / 22866

On-board services
- Classes: AC 2 tier, AC 3 tier, Sleeper class, General Unreserved
- Seating arrangements: Yes
- Sleeping arrangements: Yes
- Catering facilities: Pantry car attached
- Observation facilities: No rake sharing

Technical
- Rolling stock: Standard Indian Railways coaches
- Track gauge: 1,676 mm (5 ft 6 in)
- Operating speed: 110 km/h (68 mph) maximum 57.03 km/h (35 mph), including halts

The 22865/22866 Lokmanya Tilak Terminus–Puri Superfast Express is Superfast Express train belonging to Indian Railways that runs between Puri and Lokmanya Tilak Terminus in India.

It operates as train number 22866 from Puri to Lokmanya Tilak Terminus and as train number 22865 in the reverse direction.

== Coaches ==
22865/22866 Lokmanya Tilak Terminus–Puri Superfast Express presently has 1 1st AC, 1 AC 2 tier, 5 AC 3 tier, 9 Sleeper class, 4 General Unreserved coaches & 2 SLR with 1 pantry car.

As with most train services in India, coach composition may be amended at the discretion of Indian Railways depending on demand.

== Service ==
22866 Puri–Lokmanya Tilak Terminus Superfast Express covers the distance of 1851 kilometres in 32 hours 05 mins (57.69 km/h) and in 32 hours 50 mins (56.38 km/h) as 22865 Lokmanya Tilak Terminus–Puri Superfast Express.

As the average speed of the train is above 55 km/h, as per Indian Railways rules, its fare includes a Superfast surcharge.

It reverses direction at twice during its run at Sambalpur Junction & Jharsuguda Junction.

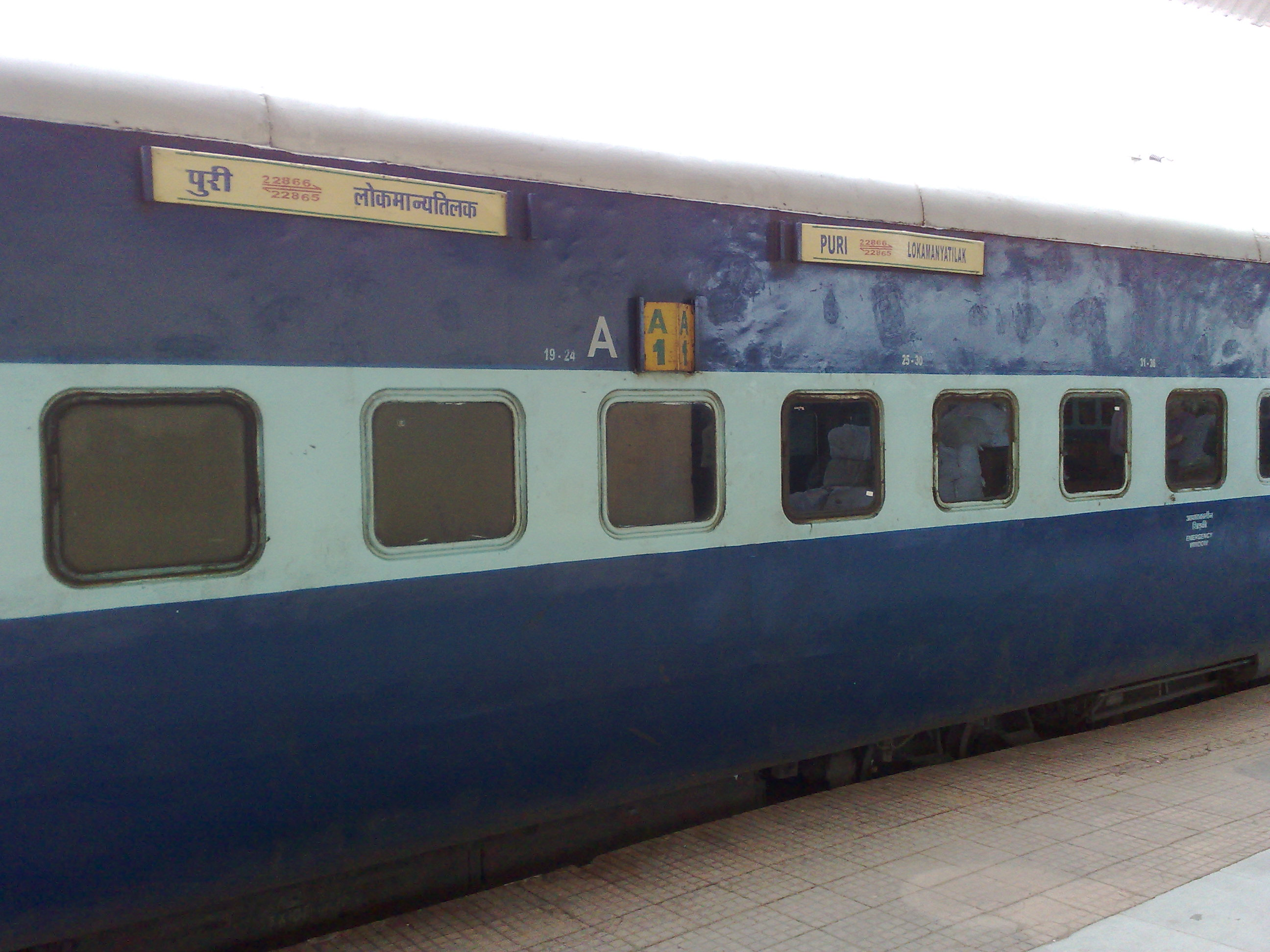
Lokmanya Tilak Terminus–Puri Superfast Express – AC 2 tier coach

== Traction ==
Initially, before 6 June 2015, this train was hauled by 3 locomotives during its run. A Visakhapatnam or Bondamunda-based WDM-3A would haul the train between Puri & Jharsuguda Junction after which an Bhusawal-based WAP-4 or Tatanagar-based WAM-4 takes over until Igatpuri handing over to a dual-traction WCAM 3 until Lokmanya Tilak Terminus.

With Central Railways progressively completed its DC–AC conversion, it is now hauled by Bhusawal-based WAP-4 or Tatanagar-based WAM-4 between Jharsuguda Junction and Lokmanya Tilak Terminus.

With the completion of electrification between Sambalpur railway station to Angul railway station, it is now hauled by an Electric Loco Shed, Bhilai-based WAP-7 end to end

== Timetable ==
- 22866 Puri–Lokmanya Tilak Terminus Superfast Express leaves Puri every Tuesday at 05:30 hrs IST and reaches Lokmanya Tilak Terminus at 13:35 hrs IST the next day.
- 22865 Lokmanya Tilak Terminus–Puri Superfast Express leaves Lokmanya Tilak Terminus every Thursday at 00:15 hrs IST and reaches Puri at 08:45 hrs IST the next day.

Station code	Station name	22866 – Puri to Lokmanya Tilak Terminus		Distance from origin (in km)	Day	22865 – Lokmanya Tilak Terminus to Puri		Distance from origin (in km)	Day
Station code	Station name	Arrival	Departure	Distance from origin (in km)	Day	Arrival	Departure	Distance from origin (in km)	Day
PURI	Puri	Origin	05:30	0	1	09:05	Destination	1,851	2
KUR	Khurda Road Junction	06:25	06:30	44	1	07:45	07:50	1808	2
BBS	Bhubaneswar	06:55	07:00	63	1	07:15	07:20	1,789	2
CTC	Cuttack Junction	07:41	07:46	91	1	06:25	06:30	1,761	2
TLHD	Talcher Road	09:18	09:19	197	1	04:33	04:35	1,655	2
ANGL	Angul	09:55	09:57	209	1	04:20	04:22	1,643	2
SBP	Sambalpur Junction	12:20	12:40	365	1	00:45	01:10	1,487	2
JSG	Jharsuguda Junction	13:45	14:05	413	1	23:30	23:50	1,438	1
RIG	Raigarh	14:51	14:53	487	1	22:16	22:18	1,365	1
BSP	Bilaspur Junction	17:00	17:15	619	1	20:20	20:35	1,233	1
R	Raipur Junction	18:50	19:00	729	1	18:25	18:35	1,122	1
NGP	Nagpur Junction	00:05	00:20	1,030	2	13:40	14:00	822	1
WR	Wardha Junction	01:37	01:40	1,109	2	12:05	12:08	743	1
BSL	Bhusaval Junction	05:40	05:50	1,422	2	06:55	07:05	429	1
MMR	Manmad Junction	08:07	08:10	1,607	2	04:47	04:50	245	1
LTT	Lokmanya Tilak Terminus	13:35	Destination	1,851	2	Origin	00:15	0	1
