= Rayagada railway station =

Railway station in Odisha, India

Rayagada
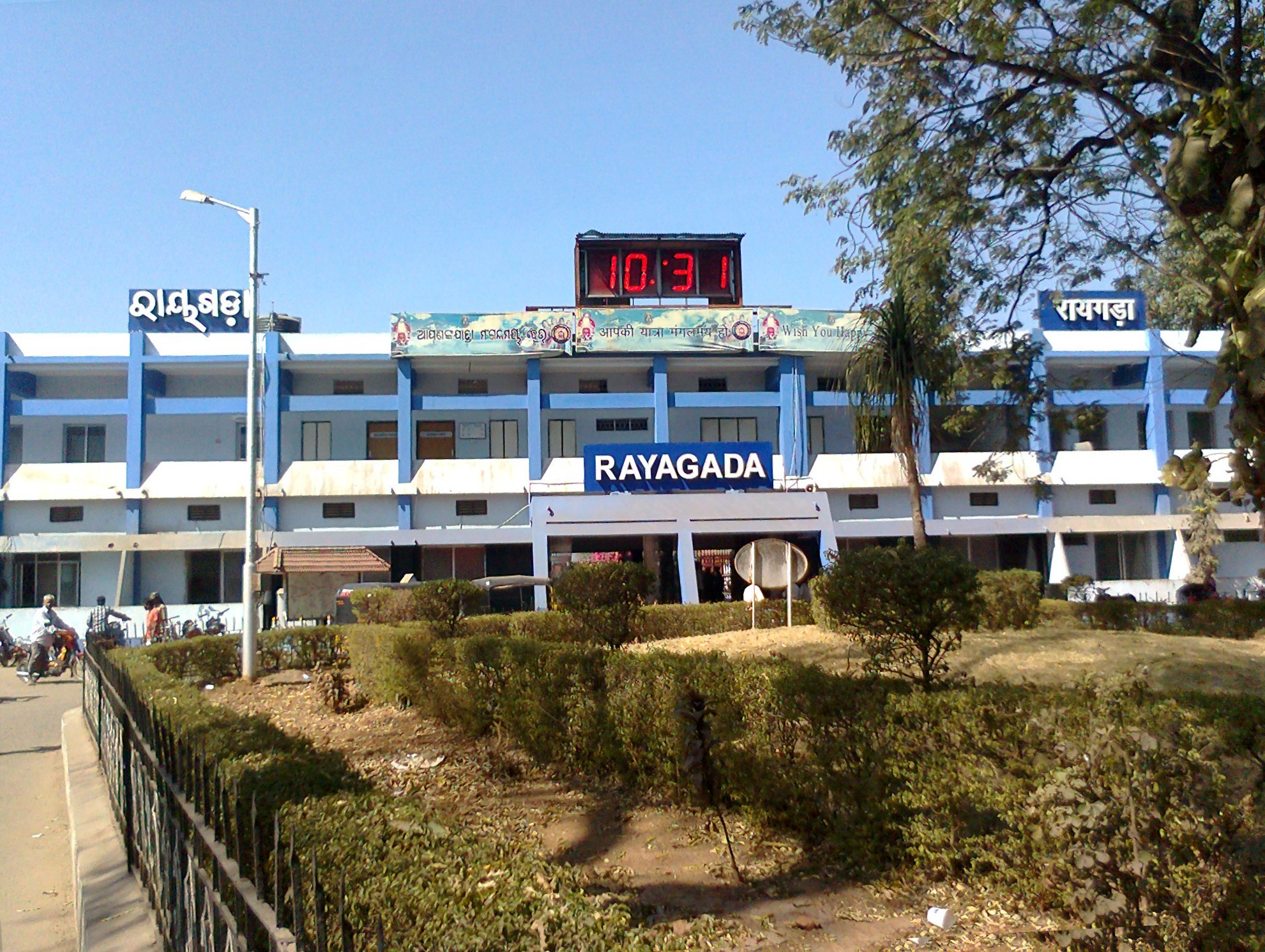
- Rayagada railway station

General information
- Location: Rayagada, Odisha; India
- Coordinates: 19°10′33″N 83°24′38″E
- Elevation: 207 m (679 ft)
- System: Indian Railways junction station
- Line: Jharsuguda–Vizianagaram line
- Platforms: 5
- Tracks: 5 ft 6 in (1,676 mm) broad gauge

Construction
- Structure type: Standard (on-ground station)
- Parking: Available

Other information
- Status: Functioning
- Station code: RGDA
- Zone(s): East Coast Railway
- Division(s): Rayagada

History
- Opened: 1931

Services
Preceding station	Indian Railways	Following station
Ladda towards ?	East Coast Railway zone Vizianagaram–Raipur branch line	Singapur Road towards ?
Terminus	East Coast Railway zone Rayagada–Koraput branch line	Singapur Road towards ?
Location
- Location within Odisha Location within India

Rayagada railway station (Station Code:- RGDA) serves Rayagada district in the Indian state of Odisha. It belongs to Visakhapatnam railway division of East Coast Railway and is located in southern Odisha. 58 trains arrive and depart from this station. This station has a direct route to more than 15 states and also well connected to all the metropolitan ities of India. The station is located at the heart of the city and now it has the longest platform in Odisha (Platform No :- 3 measuring 910m), ranked 6th in the country.

== History ==
The 79 km (49 mi) Vizianagaram–Parvatipuram line was opened in 1908–09 and an extension to Salur was built in 1913. The Parvatipuram–Raipur line was completed in December 1931.

The Koraput–Rayagada Rail Link Project was completed on 31 December 1998.

== Amenities ==
Rayagada railway station has a double-bedded non-AC retiring room and a six-bedded dormitory.

== Trains ==
Some important train that origins/terminates :

Train no.	Train name	Train type	Arrivals	Arrival time	Departures	Departure time
18301	Sambalpur–Rayagada Intercity Express	Express	Daily	13:00	Daily	14:15

List of the trains running from Rayagada railway station :-
Train number	Train name
12844	Ahmedabad–Puri Express
12843	Puri–Ahmedabad Express
17481	Bilaspur–Tirupati Express
13352	Alleppey–Dhanbad Express
13351	Dhanbad–Alappuzha Express
18448	Jagdalpur–Bhubaneswar Hirakhand Express
18447	Bhubaneswar–Jagdalpur Hirakhand Express
12835	Hatia–Yesvantpur Express
18005	Howrah Jn–Jagdalpur Samaleshwari Express
18006	Jagdalpur–Howrah Jn Samaleshwari Express
18517	Korba–Visakhapatnam Express
18310	Nanded–Sambalpur Nagawali Express
12807	Visakhapatnam–H Nizamuddin Samta Express
12808	H Nizamuddin–Visakhapatnam Samta Express
12836	Yesvantpur–Hatia Express
12889	Tatanagar–Yesvantpur Express
12890	Yesvantpur–Tatanagar Express
17482	Tirupati–Bilaspur Express
18107	Rourkela – Jagdalpur Intercity Express
18108	Jagdalpur – Rourkela Intercity Express
18189	Tatanagar–Alappuzha Express
18309	Sambalpur–Nanded Express
18518	Visakhapatnam–Korba Express
12375	Chennai–Asansol Express
12376	Asansol–Chennai Express
18211	Durg–Jagdalpur Express
18212	Jagdalpur–Durg Express
20837	Bhubaneswar–Junagarh Road SF Express
20838	Junagarh Road–Bhubaneswar SF Express
22847	Visakhapatnam–Lokmanya Tilak Super Fast Express
22848	Lokmanya Tilak–Visakhapatnam Super Fast Express
57271	Vijayawada Jn–Rayagada Passenger
57272	Rayagada–Vijayawada Jn Passenger
18638	Yesvantpur–Hatia Weekly Express
18574	Bhagat Ki Kothi–Visakhapatnam Weekly Express
19454	Puri–Gandhidham Weekly Express
58301	Sambalpur–Koraput Passenger (unreserved)
