= Electric Loco Shed, Visakhapatnam =

Loco shed in Andhra Pradesh, India

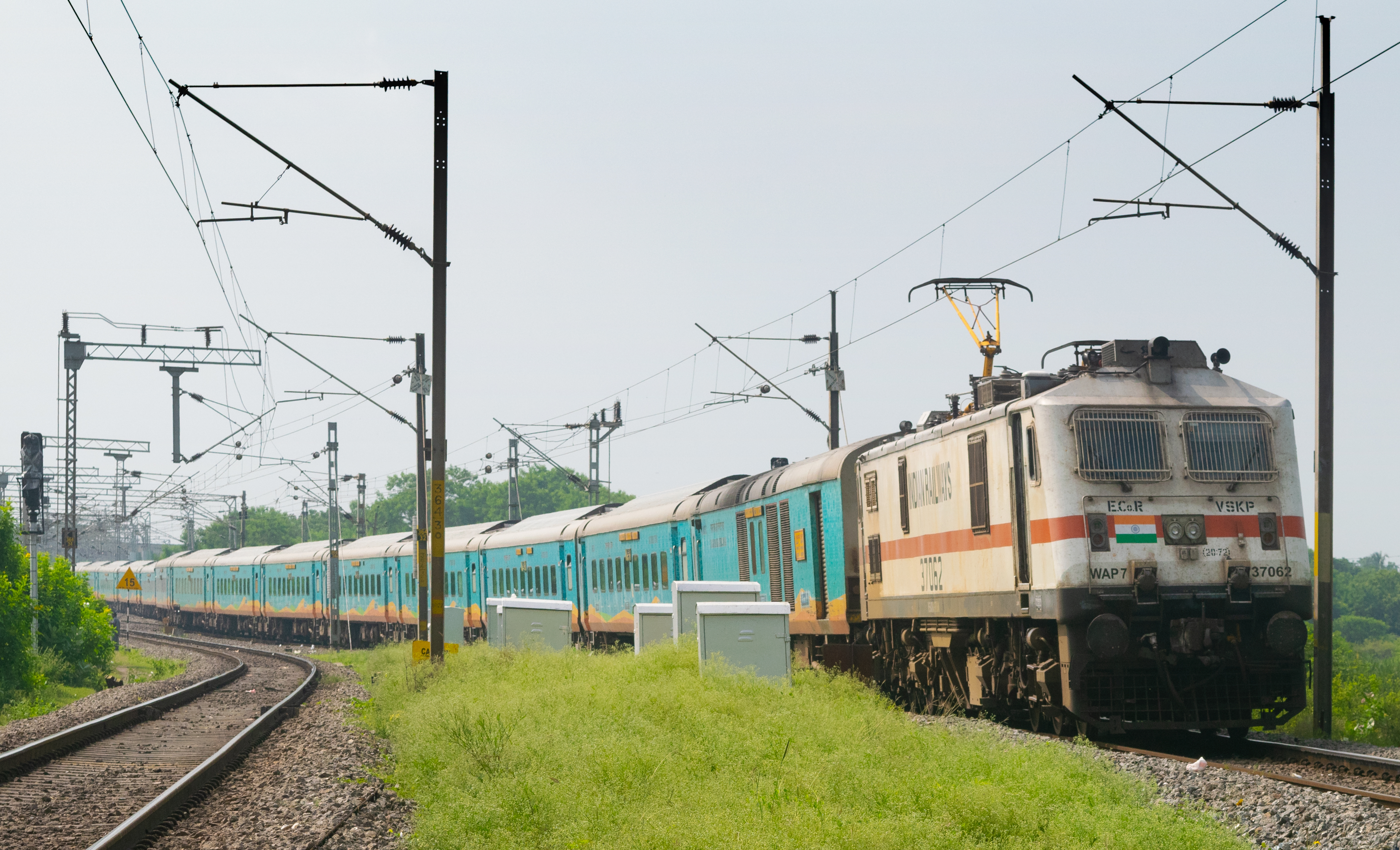
- VSKP based WAP-7 hauling Jammu Tawi - Tirupati Humsafar Express.

- Location within Visakhapatnam

Location
- Location: Visakhapatnam, Andhra Pradesh
- Coordinates: 17°43′20″N 83°17′23″E

Characteristics
- Owner: Indian Railways
- Operator: South Coast Railway zone
- Depot code: VSKP
- Type: Engine shed
- Roads: 7
- Rolling stock: WAP-7; WAG-5; WAG-9; EF12K

History
- Opened: 1982; 44 years ago
- Former rolling stock: WAM-4; WAP-4; WAG-6

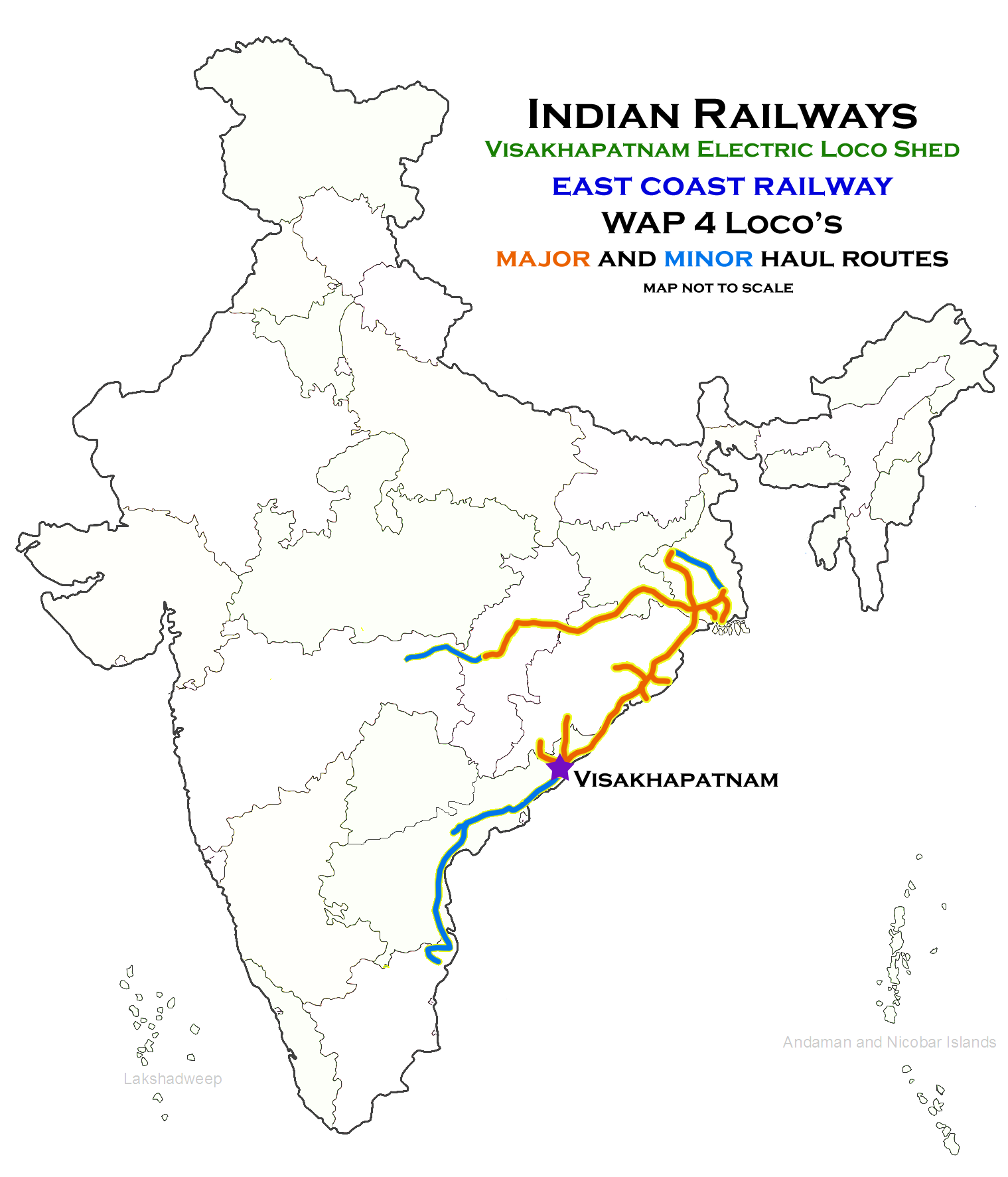

Electric Loco Shed, Visakhapatnam is a motive power depot performing locomotive maintenance and repair facility for electric locomotives of the Indian Railways, located at Visakhapatnam of the South coast railway zone

== Operations ==
The train operation on K.K.Line was started in 1966-67. Electrification was done between KRDL-JDB in 1980, JDB-KRPU in 1981, KRPU-ARK in 1982 and KTV-ARK in 1982.

Electric Loco Shed / Visakhapatnam was commissioned in Dec'82 with a holding of 30 Electric locomotives as a captive Loco shed for Kottavalasa-Kirandul line. There was steady increase in the loco holding due to increase in traffic demand over the years thereafter for transporting the iron ore from Baliadilla mines to Visakhapatnam port.

During 1988, a fleet of 18 locomotives of 6000 HP having a number of special improved features with state-of-the-art technology were imported from Sweden (6locomotives/ABB make) and from Japan (12 locomotives/Hitachi make) to add to the fleet of indigenous locomotives.

With Electrification of mainline between VSKP-BBS-KGP, shed has started homing coaching locomotives since 2005.

Since its commissioning, Shed was augmented six times in capacity. In the year 1997 shed was expanded from 75 locos to 93 locos, in the year 2000 shed was expanded form 93 locos to 120 locos, in the year 2009 shed was expanded form 120 locos to 150 locos, in the year 2017 shed was expanded form 150 locos to 175 locos, in the year 2019-20 shed was expanded form 175 locos to 200 locos capacity. Now expansion works for homing 200 locos to 225 locos capacity is ongoing. This shed houses a total of 359 engine units, including 90 WAP-7, 9 WAG-5, 218 WAG-9 and 7 EF-12K. Like all locomotive sheds, VSKP does regular maintenance, overhaul and repair including painting and washing of locomotives.

== Livery and Markings ==
VSKP ELS has its own livery black, maroon and cream band on WAG-5. Also other locomotives has its own standardised livery all over India.

VSKP ELS has its own stencils. It is written on loco's body side as well as front and back side.

== Locomotives ==
Serial No.	Locomotive Class	Horsepower	Quantity
1.	WAP-7	6350	90
2.	WAG-5	3850	9
3.	WAG-9	6120	228
4.	EF12K	12000	5
Total Locomotives Active as of June 2026			332

== See also ==
- Diesel Loco Shed, Visakhapatnam
- Electric Loco Shed, Vijayawada
