= Titlagarh Junction railway station =

Railway station in Odisha, India

Titilagarh Junction
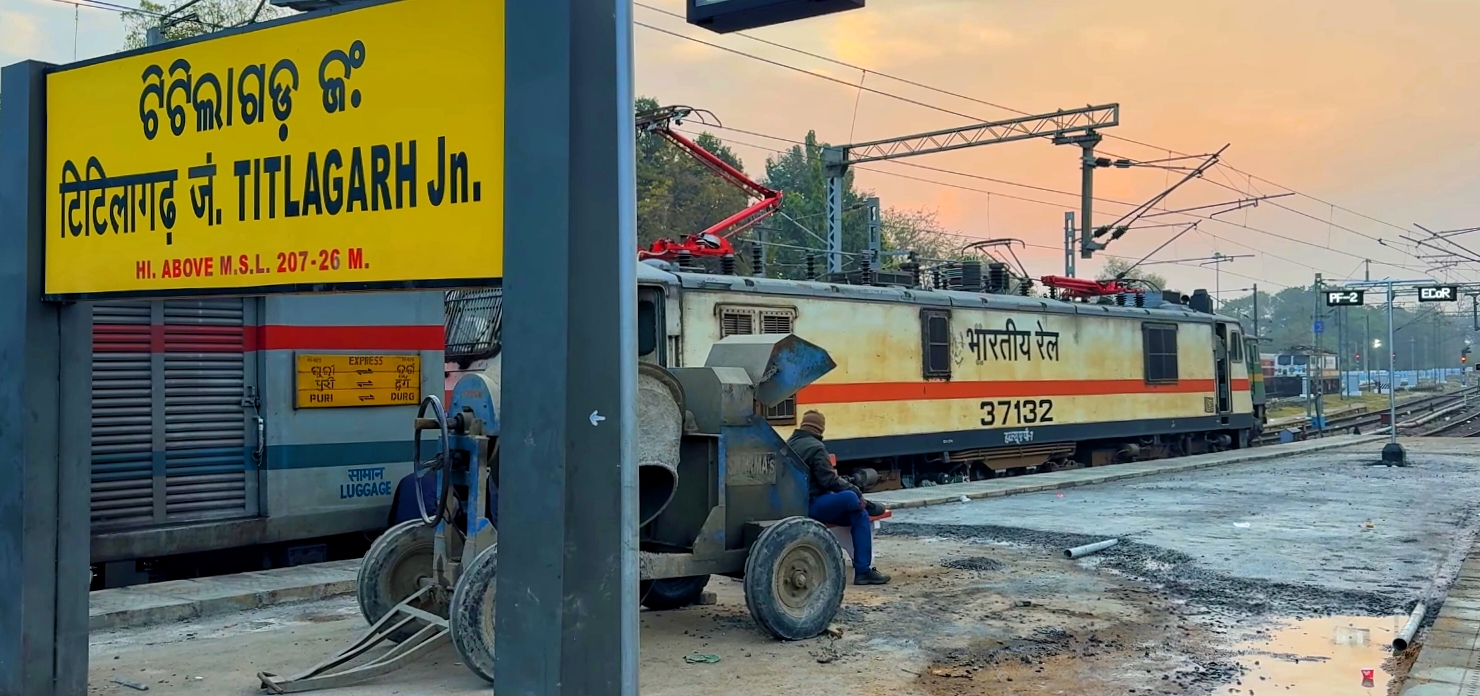
- Puri-Durg Express At Titilagarh railway station

General information
- Location: Titilagarh, Balangir District, Odisha; India
- Coordinates: 20°17′06″N 83°09′17″E
- Elevation: 215 m (705 ft)
- System: Indian Railways junction station
- Owner: Indian Railways
- Operator: East Coast Railways
- Lines: Jharsuguda–Vizianagaram line, Raipur–Vizianagaram line
- Platforms: 5
- Tracks: 7 5 ft 6 in (1,676 mm) broad gauge

Construction
- Structure type: Standard (on-ground station)
- Parking: Available

Other information
- Status: Functioning
- Station code: TIG
- Zone(s): East Coast Railway zone
- Division(s): Sambalpur

History
- Opened: 1931
- Former names: Bengal Nagpur Railway

Passengers
- 84000

Services
Preceding station	Indian Railways	Following station
Kesinga towards ?	East Coast Railway zone Viziniagram–Raipur branch line	Rahenbata towards ?
Terminus	East Coast Railway zone Titlagarh–Jharsuguda branch line	Sikir towards ?
Location
- Location within Odisha Location within India

Titilagarh Junction railway station (station code: TIG) is a major railway junction in Odisha, India, serving the town of Titilagarh in Balangir district. It is a key transportation hub for residents of nearby villages, including Sindhekela, Kholan, Naren, Parasara, Chandotara, Turla, Ghodar, Udepur, Kansil, and others.

== History ==
The Vizianagaram–Parvatipuram line, spanning 79 km (49 mi), was opened in 1908–09, followed by the completion of the Parvatipuram–Raipur line in 1931. In 1960, Indian Railways initiated three major projects: the Kottavalasa–Koraput–Jeypore–Kirandaul line, the Titilagarh–Bolangir–Jharsuguda Project, and the Rourkela–Kiriburu Project. Collectively known as the Dandakaranya Project or the DNK Project, these projects aimed to enhance rail infrastructure in the region.

The Sambalpur–Titilagarh Railway line was part of this initiative, designed to support the export of two million tons of ore annually through the Vragapattam Port. This project resulted from a tripartite agreement involving the United States, Japan, and India, with the U.S. providing a $20 million loan and Japan contributing an equivalent amount in yen. Negotiations were managed by the Ministry of Finance.

Construction of the 114 km railway line, sanctioned on April 24, 1959, was estimated to cost Rs. 14.58 crores. Additional funds were needed for the import of diesel locomotives, with the U.S. loan anticipated to cover these costs. The Sambalpur–Titilagarh line was opened to traffic in 1963.

== Railway reorganisation ==
The Bengal Nagpur Railway was nationalized in 1944. Eastern Railway was established on 14 April 1952, incorporating the eastern section of the East Indian Railway Company and the Bengal Nagpur Railway. In 1955, South Eastern Railway was created from Eastern Railway, taking over lines previously managed by Bengal Nagpur Railway. In April 2003, the East Coast Railway and South East Central Railway zones were formed from South Eastern Railway.

== Electrification ==
Electrification of the Titilagarh–Sambalpur–Jharsuguda line was completed in 2018. As of December 2019, Titilagarh Junction is connected to Raipur, Visakhapatnam, and Sambalpur via electrified lines. The Titilagarh–Sambalpur double line is under construction, with double-line operations already initiated in the BLSN–MSMD and MSMD–ARN sections. Recent reports confirm that the electrification and doubling of the Titilagarh–Rayagada line have been completed.

== Amenities ==
Titilagarh railway station has a six-bedded dormitory. Other amenities at the railway station include computerised reservation offices, telephone booth, cloak room, waiting room, vegetarian refreshment room and book stall.

== Passenger movement ==
Titilagarh railway station serves approximately 84,000 passengers daily.
