= Bhanjpur–Puri Express =

Train in India

Bhanjpur - Puri Express

Overview
- Service type: Express
- Status: Active
- Locale: Odisha
- First service: 21 May 2026; 2 months' time
- Current operator: South Eastern Railway (SER)

Route
- Termini: Bhanjpur (VZR); Puri (PURI)
- Stops: 12
- Distance travelled: 342 km (213 mi)
- Average journey time: 6h 40m
- Service frequency: Bi - Weekly
- Train number: 18017 / 18018

On-board services
- Classes: General Unreserved, Sleeper Class, AC 3rd Class, AC 2nd Class
- Seating arrangements: Yes
- Sleeping arrangements: Yes
- Catering facilities: Pantry Car
- Observation facilities: Large windows
- Baggage facilities: No
- Other facilities: Below the seats

Technical
- Rolling stock: ICF coach
- Track gauge: 1,676 mm (5 ft 6 in)
- Electrification: 25 kV 50 Hz AC Overhead line
- Operating speed: 130 km/h (81 mph) maximum, 51 km/h (32 mph) average including halts.
- Track owner: Indian Railways

The 18017 / 18018 Bhanjpur–Puri Express is an express train belonging to South Eastern Railway zone that runs between the city Bhanjpur and Puri of Odisha in India.

It operates as train number 18017 from Bhanjpur to Puri and as train number 18018 in the reverse direction, serving the states of Odisha.

== Services ==
• 18017/ Bhanjpur–Puri Express has an average speed of 51 km/h and covers 342 km in 6h 40m.

• 18018/ Puri–Bhanjpur Express has an average speed of 49 km/h and covers 342 km in 7h 0m.

== Route and halts ==
The Important Halts of the train are :

- Bhanjpur
- Baripada
- Betnoti
- Rupsa Junction
- Balasore
- Soro
- Bhadrak
- Jajpur Keonjhar Road
- Cuttack Junction
- Bhubaneswar
- Khurda Road Junction
- Puri

== Schedule ==
• 18017 - 11:10 PM (Thursday & Saturday) [Bhanjpur]

• 18018 - 11:50 PM (Sunday & Friday) [Puri]

== Coach composition ==
1. General Unreserved - 4
2. Sleeper Class - 8
3. AC 3rd Class - 3
4. AC 2nd Class - 1

== Traction ==
As the entire route is fully electrified it is hauled by a Howrah Shed-based WAP-7 electric locomotive from Bhanjpur to Puri and vice versa.

== Rake share ==
The train will rake sharing with Shalimar–Bhanjpur Express (18015/18016).

== See also ==
No trains from Bhanjpur :

Trains from Puri :

1. Puri–Shalimar Garib Rath Express
2. Puri–Ahmedabad Express
3. Howrah–Puri Vande Bharat Express
4. Sri Jagannath Express
5. Puri–Kamakhya Weekly Express (via Howrah)

== Notes ==
a. Runs 2 day in a week with both directions.
