= Shalimar–Bhanjpur Express =

Train in India

Shalimar - Bhanjpur Express

Overview
- Service type: Express
- Status: Active
- Locale: West Bengal and Odisha
- First service: 21 May 2026; 2 months' time
- Current operator: South Eastern Railway (SER)

Route
- Termini: Shalimar (SHM); Bhanjpur (VZR)
- Stops: 15
- Distance travelled: 266 km (165 mi)
- Average journey time: 5h 20m
- Service frequency: Bi - Weekly
- Train number: 18015 / 18016

On-board services
- Classes: General Unreserved, Second Sitting, Sleeper Class
- Seating arrangements: Yes
- Sleeping arrangements: Yes
- Catering facilities: Pantry Car
- Observation facilities: Large windows
- Baggage facilities: No
- Other facilities: Below the seats

Technical
- Rolling stock: ICF coach
- Track gauge: 1,676 mm (5 ft 6 in)
- Electrification: 25 kV 50 Hz AC Overhead line
- Operating speed: 130 km/h (81 mph) maximum, 50 km/h (31 mph) average including halts.
- Track owner: Indian Railways

The 18015 / 18016 Shalimar–Bhanjpur Express is an express train belonging to South Eastern Railway zone that runs between the city Shalimar of West Bengal and Bhanjpur of Odisha in India.

It operates as train number 18015 from Shalimar to Bhanjpur and as train number 18016 in the reverse direction, serving the states of Odisha and West Bengal.

== Services ==
• 18015/ Shalimar–Bhanjpur Express has an average speed of 50 km/h and covers 266 km in 5h 20m.

• 18016/ Bhanjpur–Shalimar Express has an average speed of 43 km/h and covers 266 km in 6h 15m.

== Route and halts ==
The Important Halts of the train are :

- Shalimar
- Santragachi Junction
- Bagnan
- Panskura Junction
- Kharagpur Junction
- Belda
- Jaleswar
- Basta
- Rupsa Junction
- Jugpura
- Betnoti
- Krishnachandrapur
- Jamsole
- Baripada
- Bhanjpur

== Schedule ==
• 18015 - 4:25 PM (Thursday & Saturday) [Shalimar]

• 18016 - 9:15 AM (Monday & Saturday) [Bhanjpur]

== Coach composition ==
1. General Unreserved - 4
2. Second Sitting - 2
3. Sleeper Class - 2

== Traction ==
As the entire route is fully electrified it is hauled by a Howrah Shed-based WAP-7 electric locomotive from Shalimar to Bhanjpur and vice versa.

== Rake reversal or rake share ==
The train will reverse 1 time :

1. Rupsa Junction

The train will rake sharing with Bhanjpur–Puri Express (18017/18018).

== See also ==
Trains from Shalimar :

1. Shalimar–Lokmanya Tilak Terminus Express
2. Shalimar–Puri Express
3. Shalimar–Porbandar Superfast Express
4. Thiruvananthpuram–Shalimar Express
5. Gurudev Express

No trains from Bhanjpur :

== Notes ==
a. Runs 2 day in a week with both directions.
