= Jagaddhatri Puja =

Festival dedicated to Goddess Jagaddhatri, aspect of goddess Durga

Jagaddhatri / Jagadhatri / Mahadurga
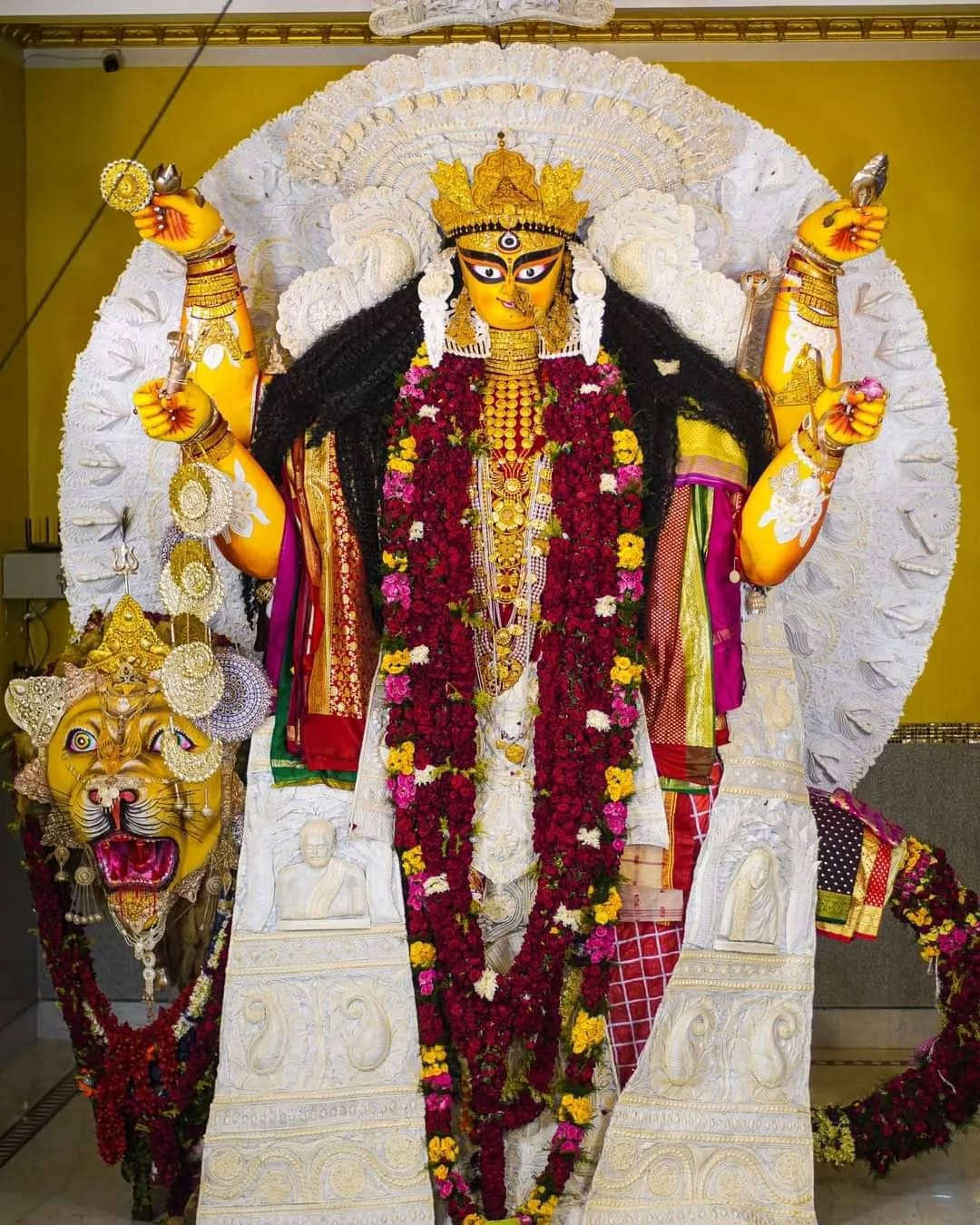
- Ma Jagadhatri (Burima) 2024, Chasapara Barowari, Krishnanagar.
- Affiliation: Mahadevi, Parvati, Durga, Jagaddhatri, Mahadurga, Uma Haimavati
- Mantra: ॐ महादेव्यै बिद्महे, सिंहवाहिन्यै धीमहि, तन्नो देवी प्रचोदयात॥
- Weapon: Chakram, Bow, Arrow, conch
- Color: Red and green
- Mount: Lion
- Consort: Shiva

Jagaddhatri Puja is a Hindu festival. It is famous in Krishnanagar in Nadia, Chandannagar, Rishra and Singur in Hooghly and Ichhapur Nawabgunj in North 24 Parganas in West Bengal where it is celebrated either for five days or on the Navami tithi only. Her worship and rituals are derived from Tantra. It is believed that her worship frees her devotees from ego and all other materialistic desires.

According to the Puranas, Jagadhatri is the incarnation of Siddhidhatri. She is also said to be the combined form of Sri Bhuvaneshwari and Durga. In some Tantras and in Shiva Purana she is known as Uma Haimavati. In Katyayini Tantra she is also known as Mahadurga. In Bengal, Jagaddhatri puja is celebrated as the comeback of Devi, specifically in Krishnanagar, Chandannagar, Rishra, Singur and Guptipara.

== History of worship ==
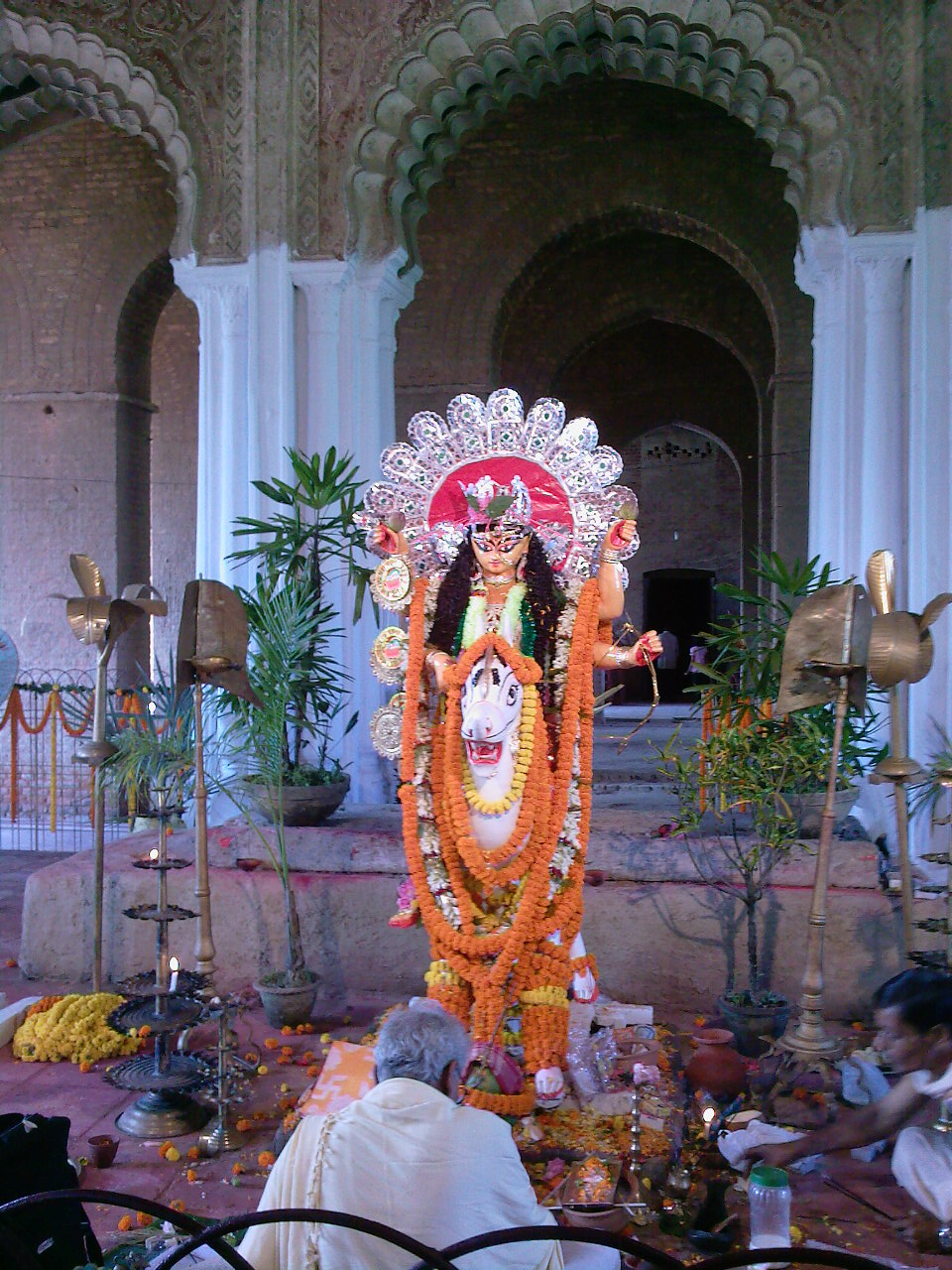
Jagatdhatri Puja at Krishnanagar Royal Palace

There are variations regarding the history of worship of the goddess in Bengal. The popular narrative states that the worship was begun by Maharaja Krishnachandra of Krishnanagar, Nadia. However, as per local history, the worship of goddess Jagatdhatri was first established by Chandrachur Tarkamani of Santipur who made an idol of the goddess at the behest of Raja Girishchandra. At the time only ghat puja was conducted at Krishnanagar, Nadia in Bengal. Idol worship of the goddess was initiated in the village of Bramhasason, which is located in Haripur in Santipur, Nadia.

At Krishnanagar, Raj Rajeshwary Jagatdhatri Puja is one of the oldest in Bengal. As per local history, Maharaja Krishnachandra was arrested by Nawab Alivardi Khan once for not paying taxes on time. He was released from prison during the day of Vijaya Dashami. Having missed the entire festivity of Durga Puja in his kingdom, Maharaja became extremely sad. Seeing her devotee sad, the ultimate mother, Goddess Jagaddhatri gave Maharaja a vision and the king commenced the ritual of Jagatdhatri Puja in his native place. The puja was performed by Raj Rajeshwary (Raj Mata in Bengali language) and there is another rumour before the start, a Jagatdhatri Puja was donated by Maharaja Krishna Chandra named Maa Jaleshwari at "Malopara Barowary". The worship of the goddess was later resumed by Sarada Devi, wife of Ramakrishna.

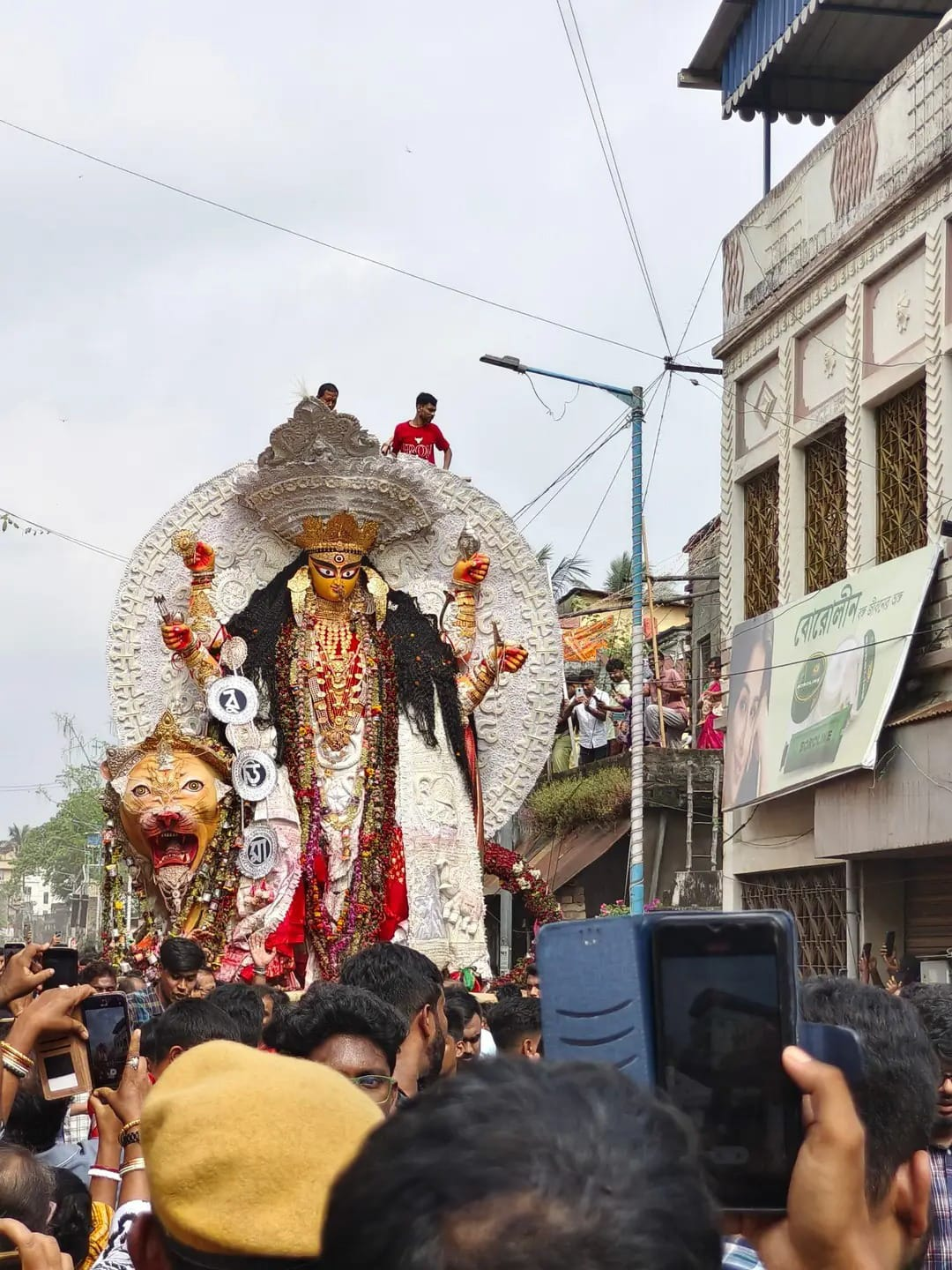
Burima 2025 Sovayatra, Krishnanagar

The Jagatdhatri puja of Bose family and Chatterjee family, Palpara and Bhavanipur, deserves a special mention in this regard. The puja of Bose family initially used to be held in their ancestral home in Murshidabad. Folklore has it that this puja was started in 1788. The puja was later shifted to its present location in Chandannagar, where many of the family members now live. The exact history of the deity is unknown, but family records date it back to 1640. In Chatterjee family this puja originates from 1700 in Srirampur which later was shifted to Chatterjee's official ancestral home in 1936 by Hari Mohan Chatterjee. For over 40 years it remained the centre of attraction during the festivities. After the demise of Hari Mohan Chatterjee the puja was continued by 3 generations by Shashanka Chatterjee, Nilanka Chatterjee (Son of Late Shashanka Chatterjee) and at present by Tirthanka Chatterjee and Ankita Chatterjee (children of Nilanka and Jayeeta Chatterjee). In 2023 the puja got shifted again for the 2nd time in 200 years to Bangalore, marking a historic shift to South of India. The Puja is continued by Chatterjees with all grandeur and tradition dating back centuries. Researcher Mohit Roy has noted that Jagadhatri vigraha from Barisal is from the 8th Century. Currently, the vigraha is in the Ashutosh Museum (Kolkata). One must note that such Simha-Vahini vigrahas have been discovered plenty, particularly from western Bengal.

The first textual mention of Jagadhatri puja comes from Kalviveka of Smarta Shulapani, dated approximately from 1375 to 1460. Later Smartas "Brihaspati Raymukut" and "Srinatha Acharya Churamani" have mentioned the goddess in their work.

The time in which she is worshipped, Shukla Paksha of the pious month of Kartika, especially the Tithi of Navami, is very auspicious. In ancient times, it was known as Chandika Puja. According to Smritisagara and Mahamohopadhhaya Panchanan Tarkaratna, it is the day to worship Uma.

The oldest temple of the goddess is in Somra (Hooghly), also known as Mahavidya temple. It was established in 1621 CE. The worship of the goddess takes place in the Dekhuria village as well in Birbhum. Still older is the Jagadhatri puja of Baligram village (Jiaganj, Murshidabad), dated back to five hundred years ago. Bandyopadhyay family of Mirhat of Kalna are observing Jagadhatri puja for more than four hundred years. Jagadhatri puja is the main Puja of Dhatrigram, Baidyapur & Mirhat of Kalna. The 350-year-old Chandrapati family's kuladevi is Jagrata.

== Festivities ==
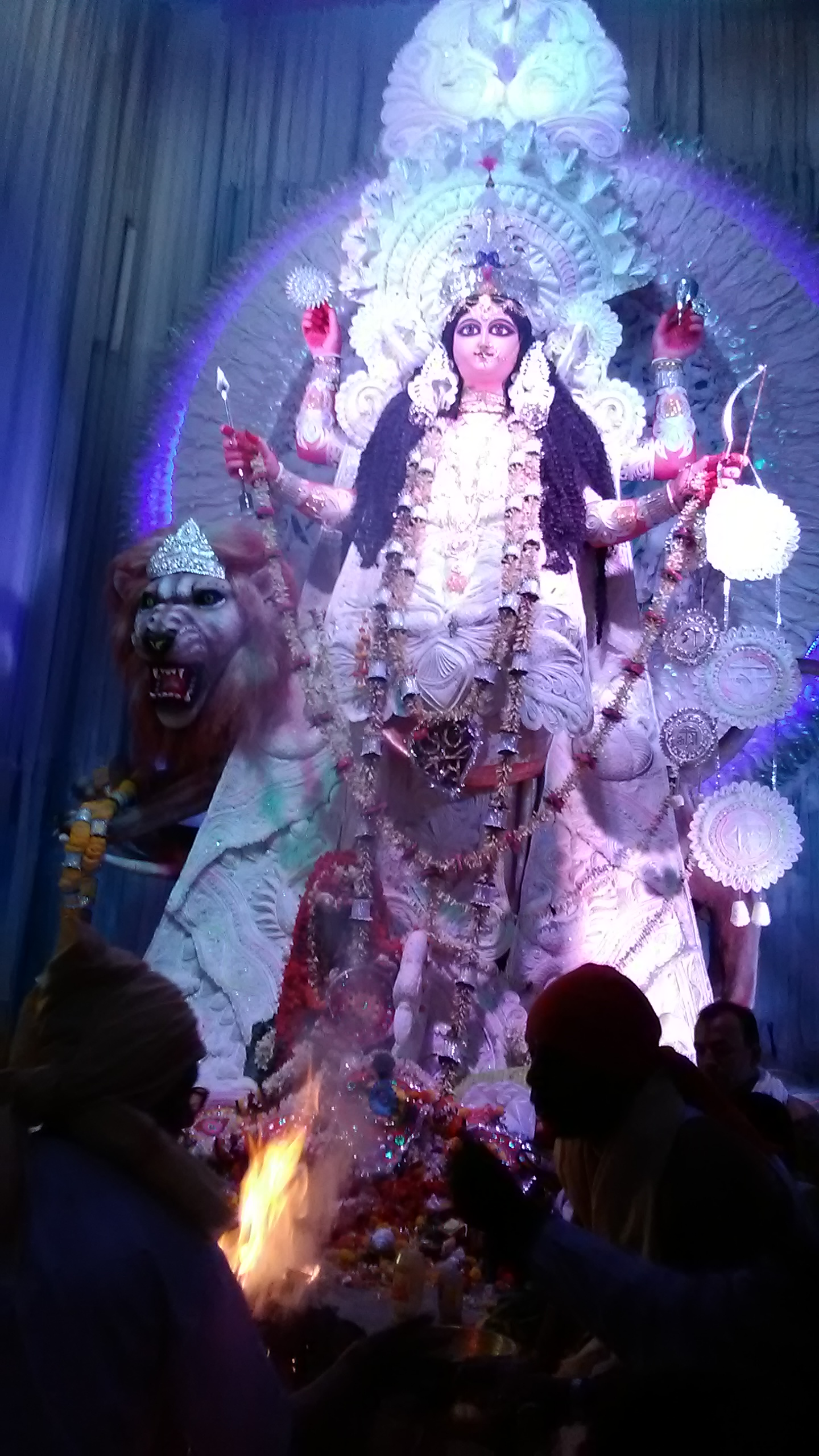
The Goddess of Jagatdhatri at Chandannagar day of Navami puja

Jagatdhatri Puja is very popular in Krishnanagar, Chandannagar, Tehatta, Rishra, Singur, Howrah, Bhadreswar, (Sutragarh-Santipur), Boinchi and Ashoknagar-Kalyangarh.

The Jagadhatri puja of Krishnanagar is a visual and spiritual celebration to see. During this time the city adorns itself with lights, flowers, pandals and the likes. Each year more than 5 lakh devotees come to Krishnanagar to be a part of this grandiose festival. There are more than 200 clubs and barowaris which organise Jagadhatri puja in the city. The Jagadhatri puja of Krishnagar is a perfect blending of devotion, emotion and celebration. The most popular Jagadhatri puja is the "Burima" of "Chasa Para", which was started in 1772. This deity is called the Tirupathi of Krishnanagar. Each year the idol is embellished with 150 kg gold and 150 kg silver ornaments with more than 10 benarasis and jamdanis. Besides "Buri Maa", "Choto Maa" (the deity of Kathalpota Barowari), "Mejo Maa" (the deity of College Street Barowari) and "Maa Jaleswari" (the idol of Malo para Barowari) are also very famous. There is also a ritual during immersion all the people from krishnanagar call it "Sang".

The festival in Chandannagar is mainly due to a collaboration between the French and Bengalis. Its procession is the second largest in the world after Rio de Janeiro's, featuring elaborate lighting.

== Jagadhatri Mela ==
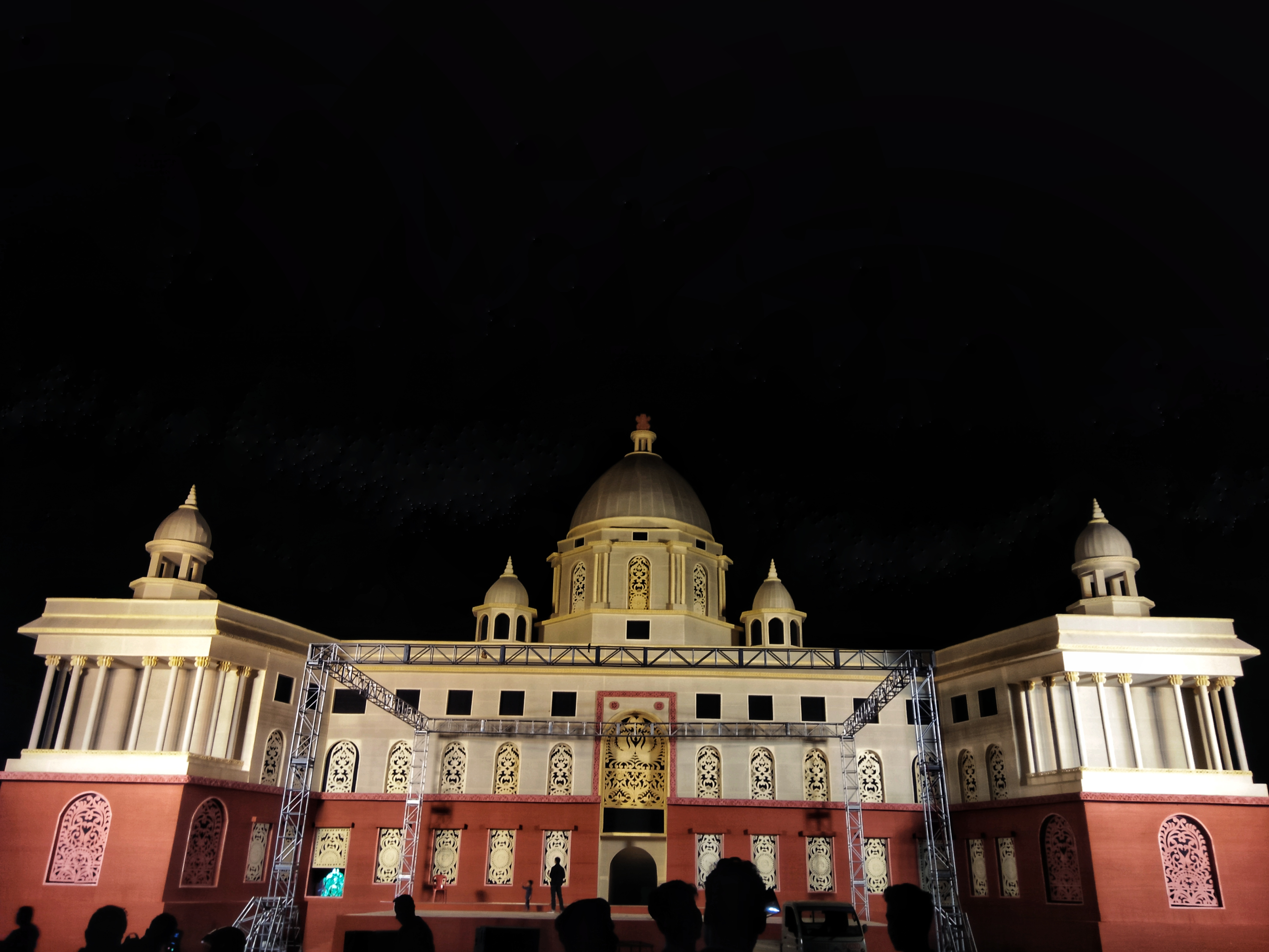
Replica of Rashtrapati Bhavan in Bhanjpur Jagaddhatri Puja 2022

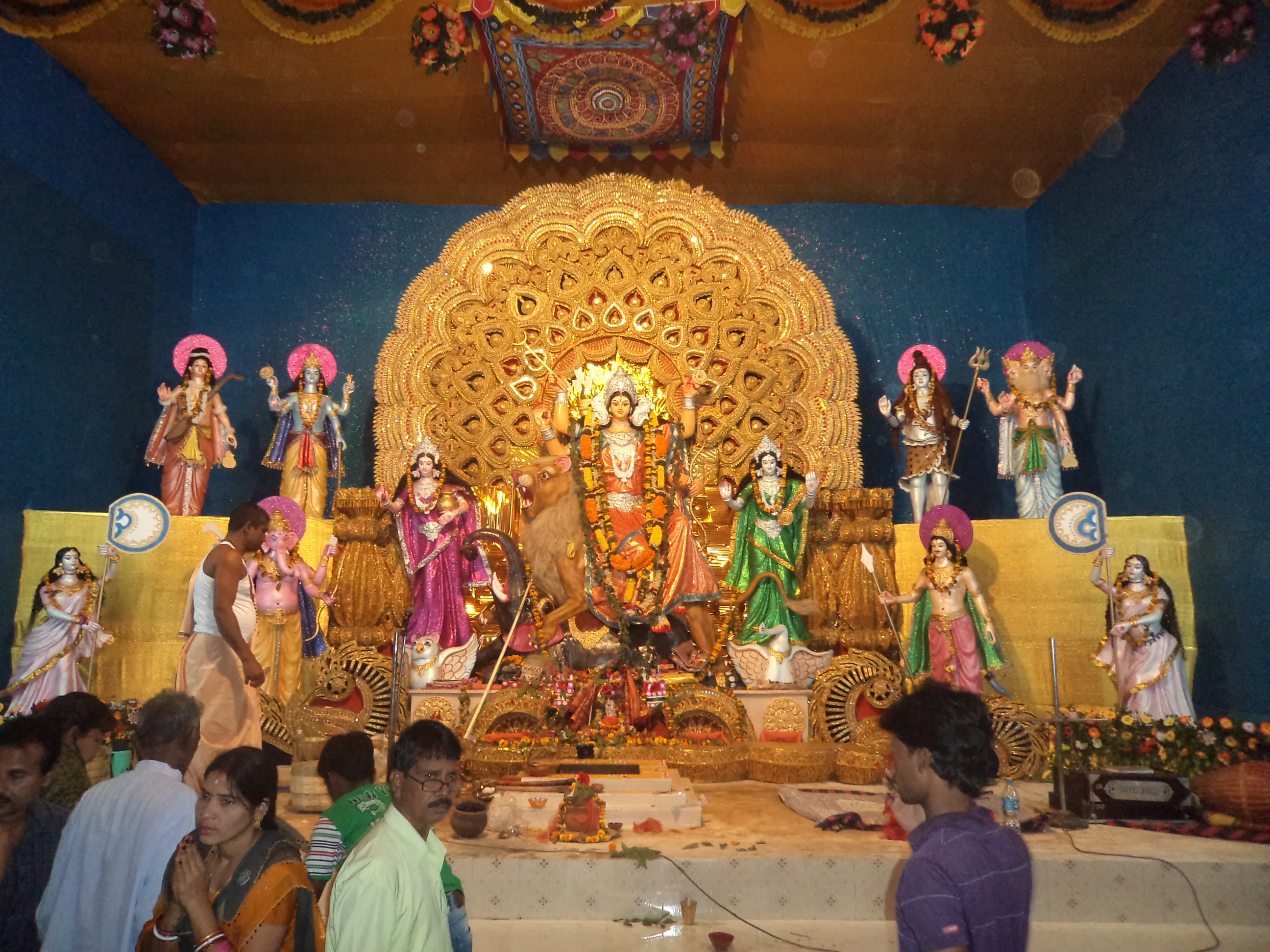
Idol of Maa Jagadhatri at Bhanjpur Jagadhatri Mela, Baripada(2012)

After Ratha Yatra, Jagadhatri Mela at Bhanjpur Jagadhatri Podia, is the biggest mela of Baripada, Odisha. It is the festival of Maa Jagadhatri, Goddess of the whole world. There is an 8–15 day mela (carnival) also known as mini Bali Jatra named after Cuttack's Bali Jatra which takes place at Jagadhatri Mela Podia, Bhanjpur, near the Bhanjpur railway Station during the month of October–November. It is celebrated on Gosthastami. It is also referred to as another Durga Puja as it also starts on Asthami tithi and ends on Dashami tithi. The date of the puja is decided by the luni-solar Hindu calendar.

In 2012, the "Sarbajanin Maa Jagadhatri Puja" has been started from 21 November. But the mela continued from 26 November to 7 December (for the first time it was for such a long period of 13 days). As the puja was celebrating its Diamond Jubilee for completing 60 years.

In 2013, the "Sarbajanin Maa Jagadhatri Puja" was started on 11 November. But to commemorate the loss of Odisha, specifically Mayurbhanj district and Baripada due to Phailin and post Phailin flood, the Cultural Program and it's live telecast on Blue Sky was cancelled. Still. the "mela" was held from 14 to 25 November 2013.

Every year its main attraction is the Puja Torana (Pandal) and the Mela. The Pandal is decorated as a famous monument in 2011 it was a miniature of US Capitol Building, United States. This year, it is Lalitha Mahal, Mysore. From the year 2000 it has been a tradition to decorate the torana as a special infrastructure. Tajmahal in Agra, Victoria Memorial in Kolkata, the Titanic, Lotus Temple in New Delhi, Golden Temple in Punjab and many other monuments were also mimicked in the previous years since 2000 to 2006. As a tribute to 26/11 Hotel Taj Mahal Palace & Tower, Mumbai attack victims, the torana of the year 2009 is a lookalike of that hotel.

== Gallery ==
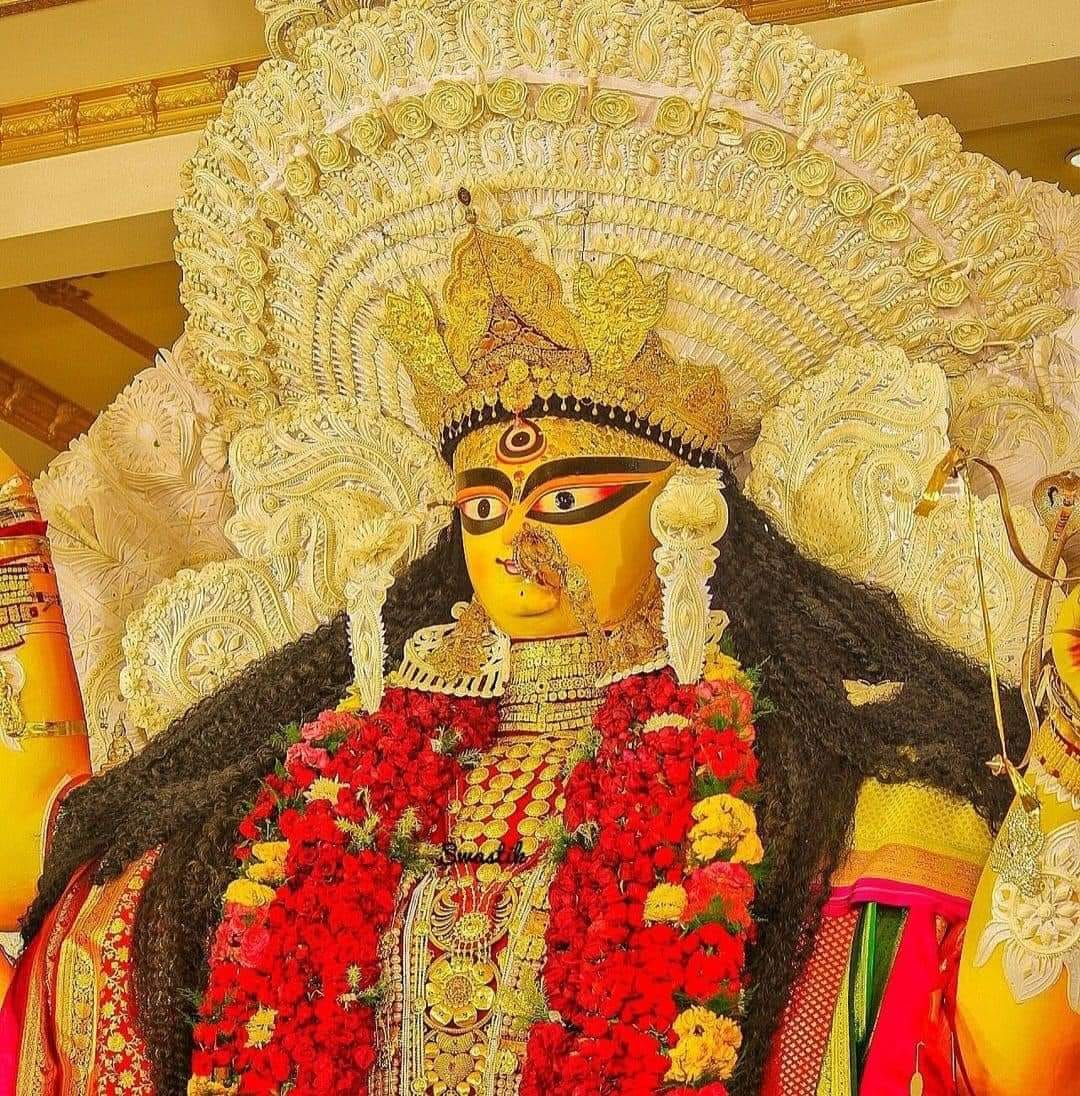
Burima, Krishnanagar

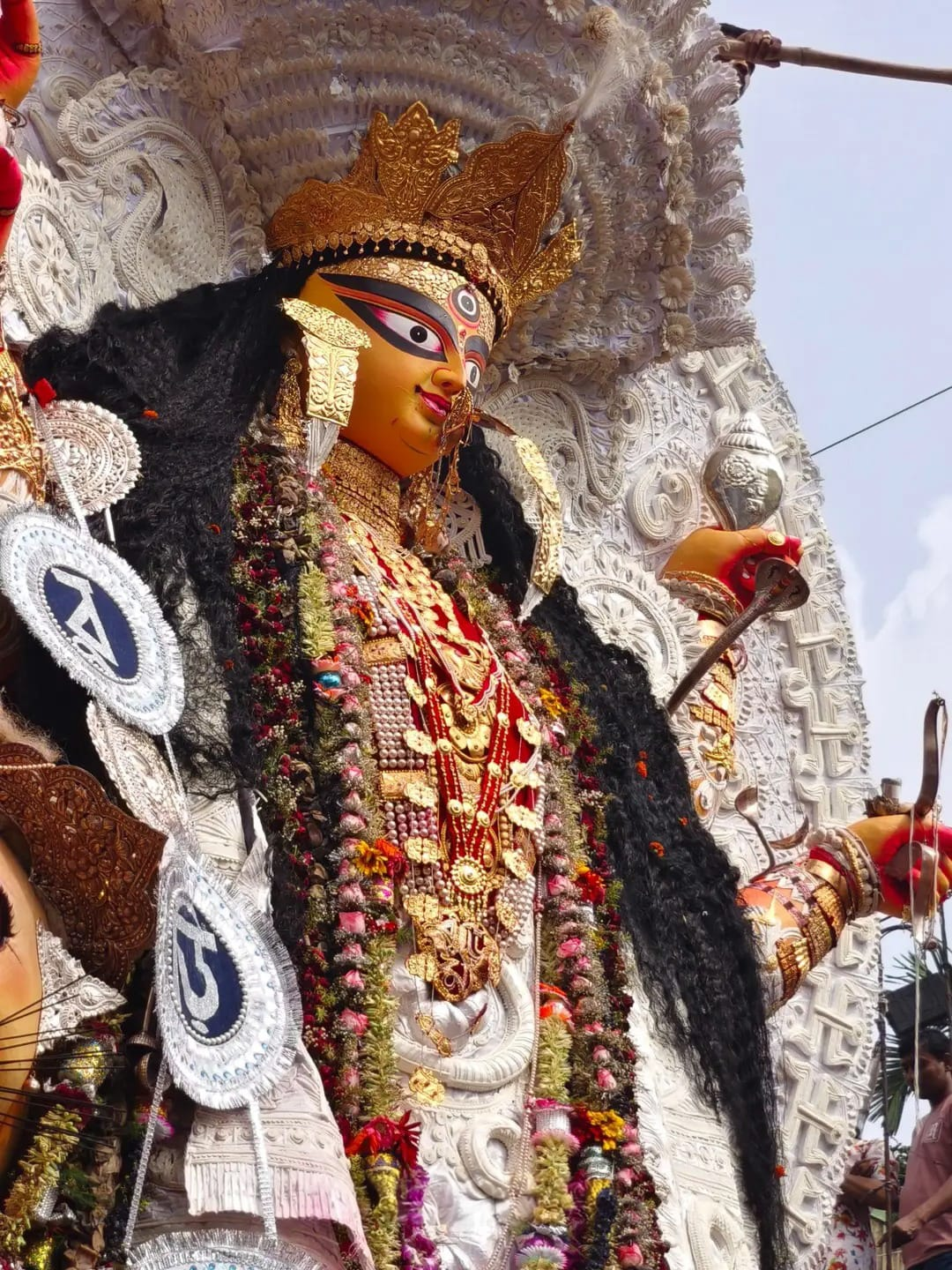
Ma jagadhatri (Burima), Krishnanagar

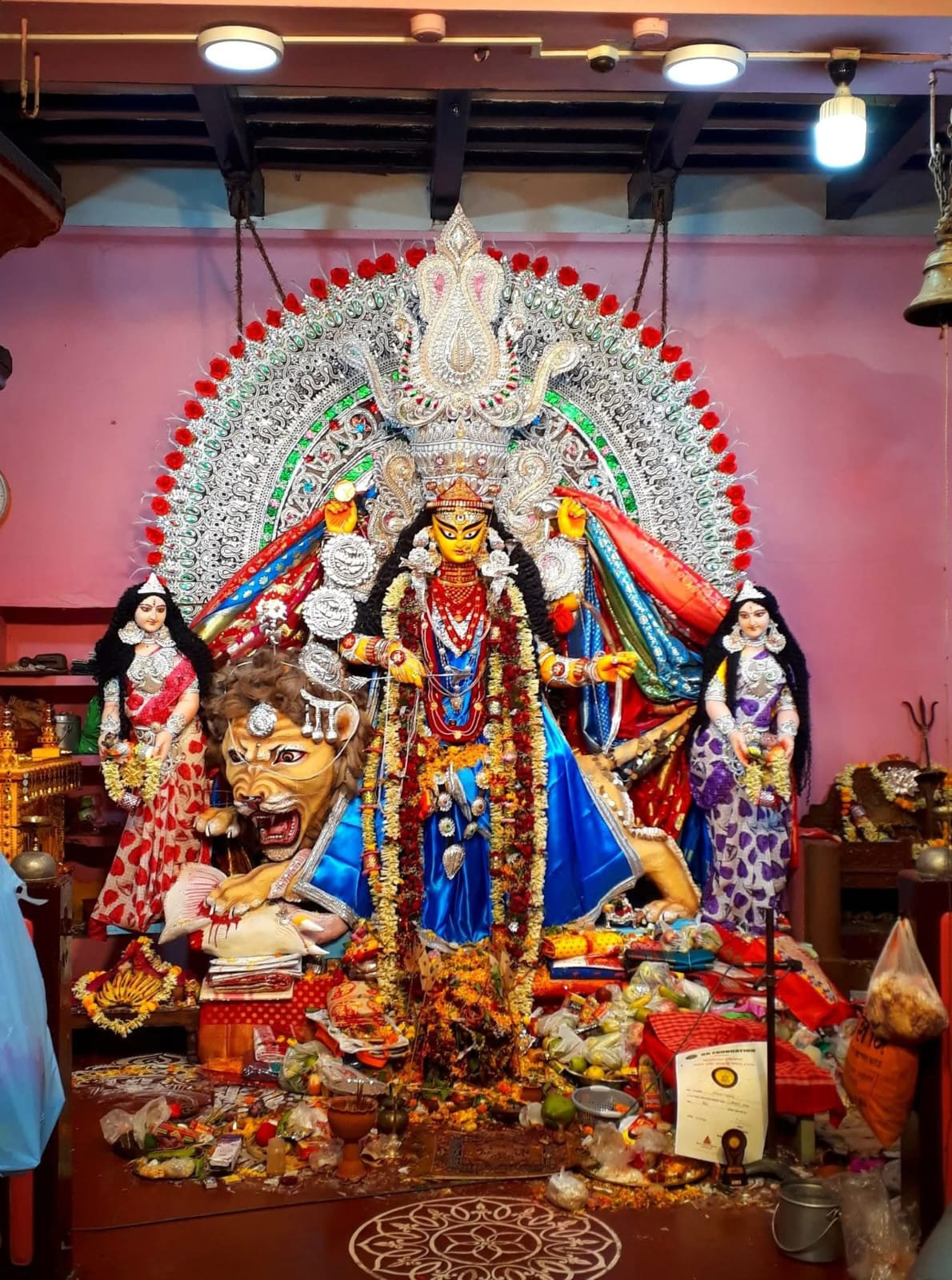
Maa Joleshawari, Malopara Barowari, Krishnanagar

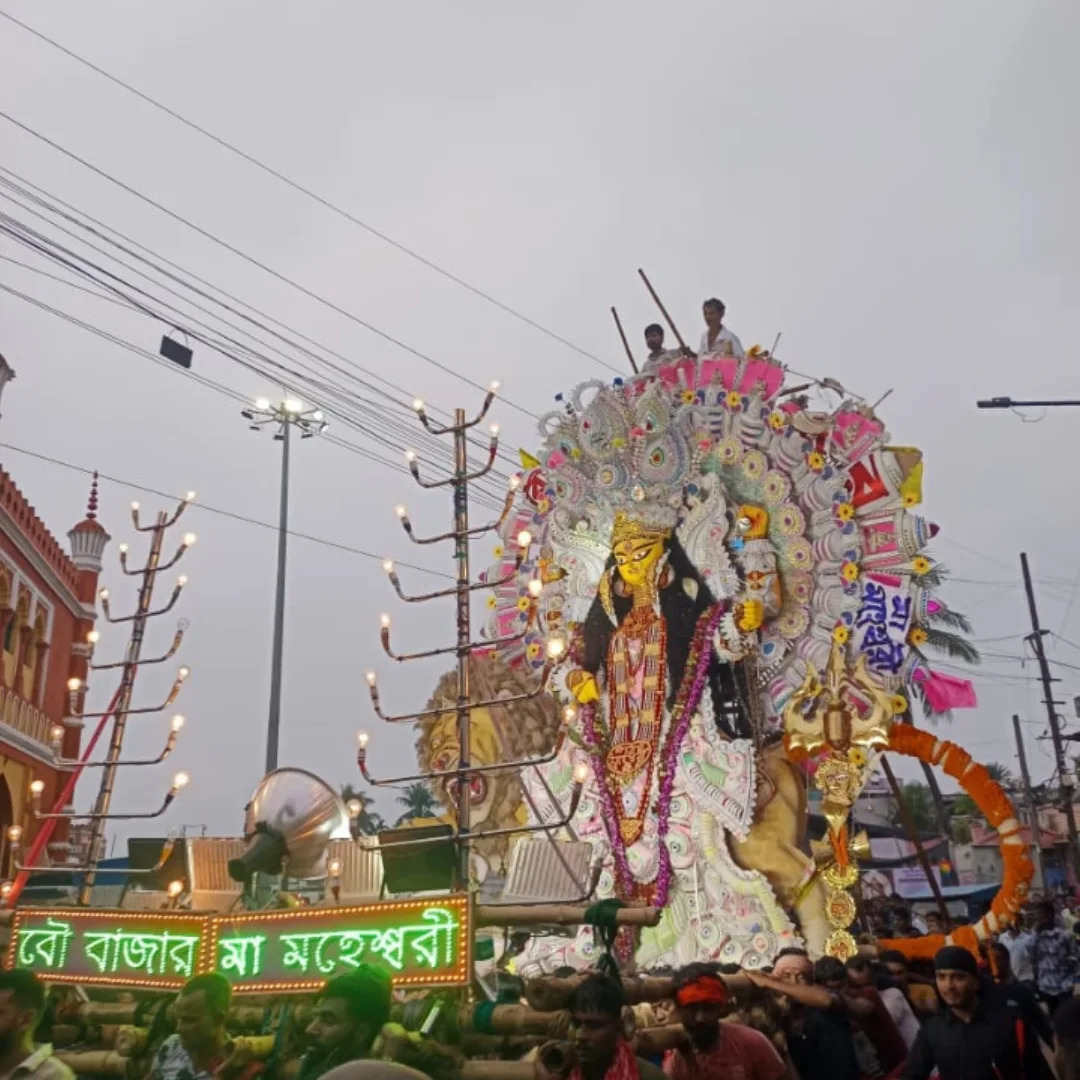
Ma Maheshawari, Boubajar Barowari, Krishnanagar

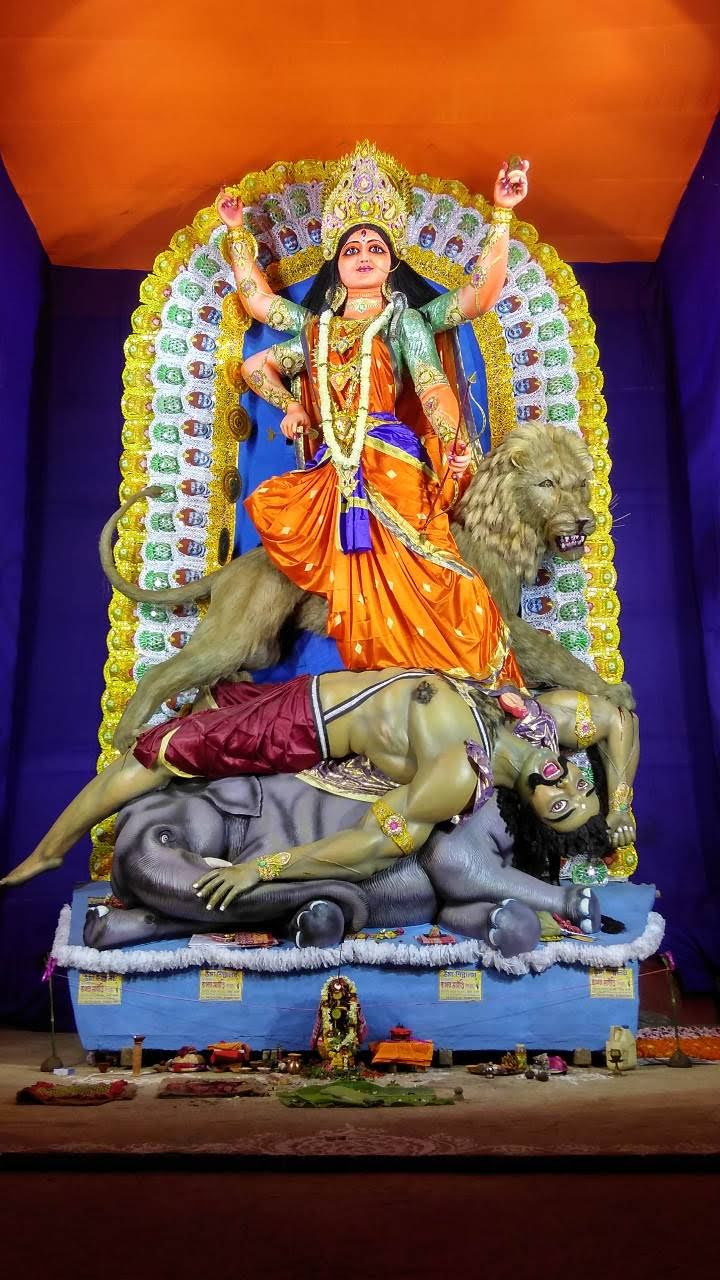
The Goddess of Jagadhatri at Ratanpur Baro Jagadhatri Tola of Singur

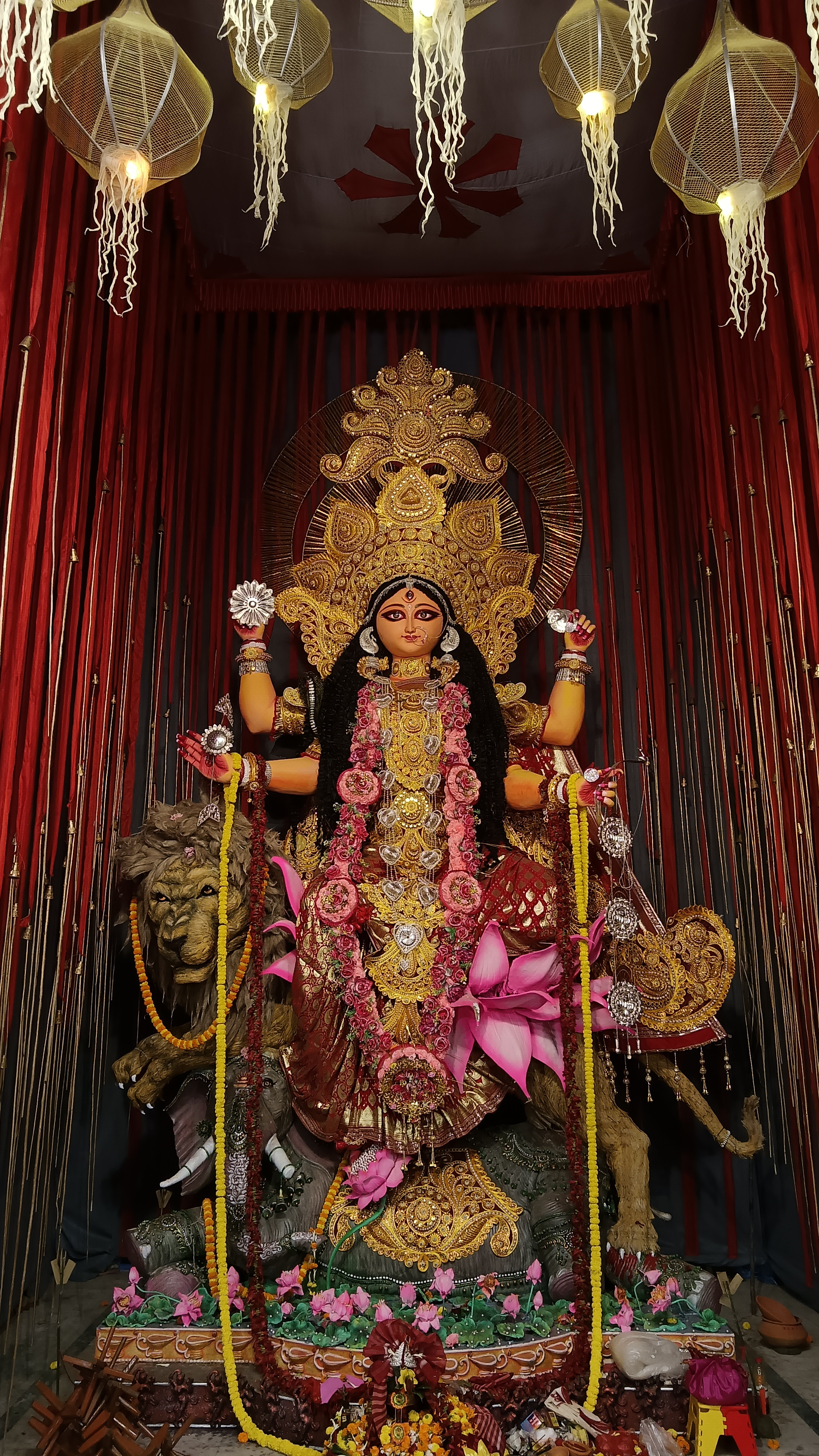
2023 Theme of Chandannagar Jagaddhatri Puja

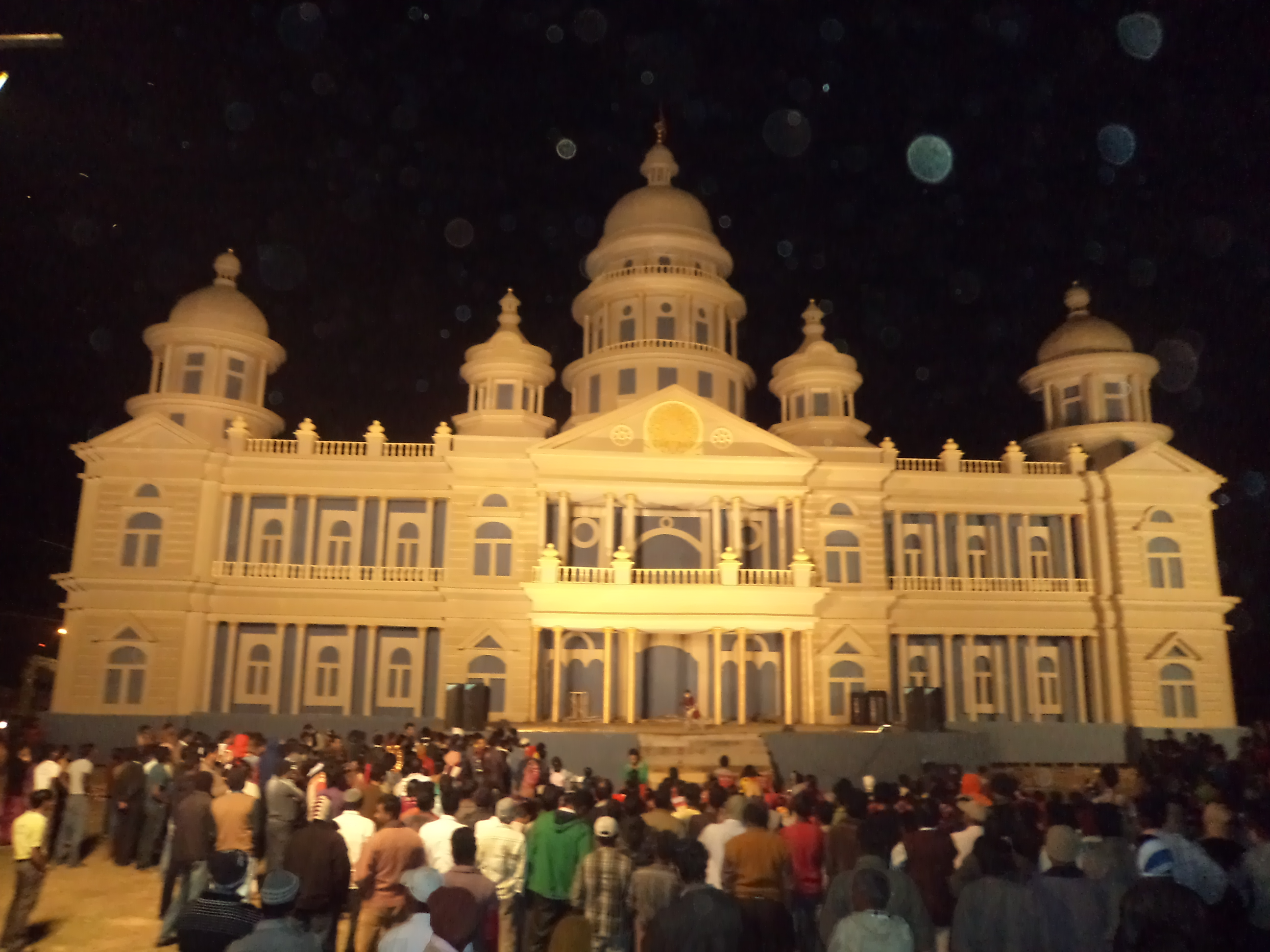
Jagadhatri Puja Torana 2012 designed as Lalitha Mahal, Mysore

== See also ==
- List of festivals in West Bengal
- List of Hindu festivals
