= Nachhipuria =

Village in Odisha, India

Coordinates: 21.646599°N 86.919882°E

Nachhipuria is a village in the town of Betnoti in the Mayurbhanj district of Orissa, India. The population in 2011 was 1332.
