= Simlipal Intercity Express =

Train in India

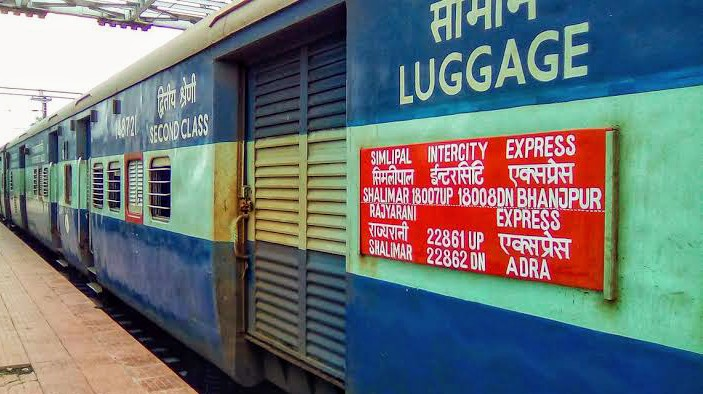
- Simlipal Intercity Express train board.

Overview
- Service type: Express
- First service: 12 January 2011; 14 years ago
- Current operator: South Eastern Railway

Route
- Termini: Shalimar (SHM); Bhanjpur (VZR)
- Stops: 13
- Distance travelled: 266 km (165 mi)
- Average journey time: 5 hrs 30 mins
- Service frequency: Tri Weekly
- Train number: 18007 / 18008

On-board services
- Class: General Unreserved
- Seating arrangements: Yes
- Sleeping arrangements: No
- Catering facilities: Not available
- Observation facilities: Large windows
- Baggage facilities: No
- Other facilities: Below the seats

Technical
- Rolling stock: ICF coach
- Track gauge: 1,676 mm (5 ft 6 in)
- Operating speed: 48 km/h (30 mph) average including halts.
Route map
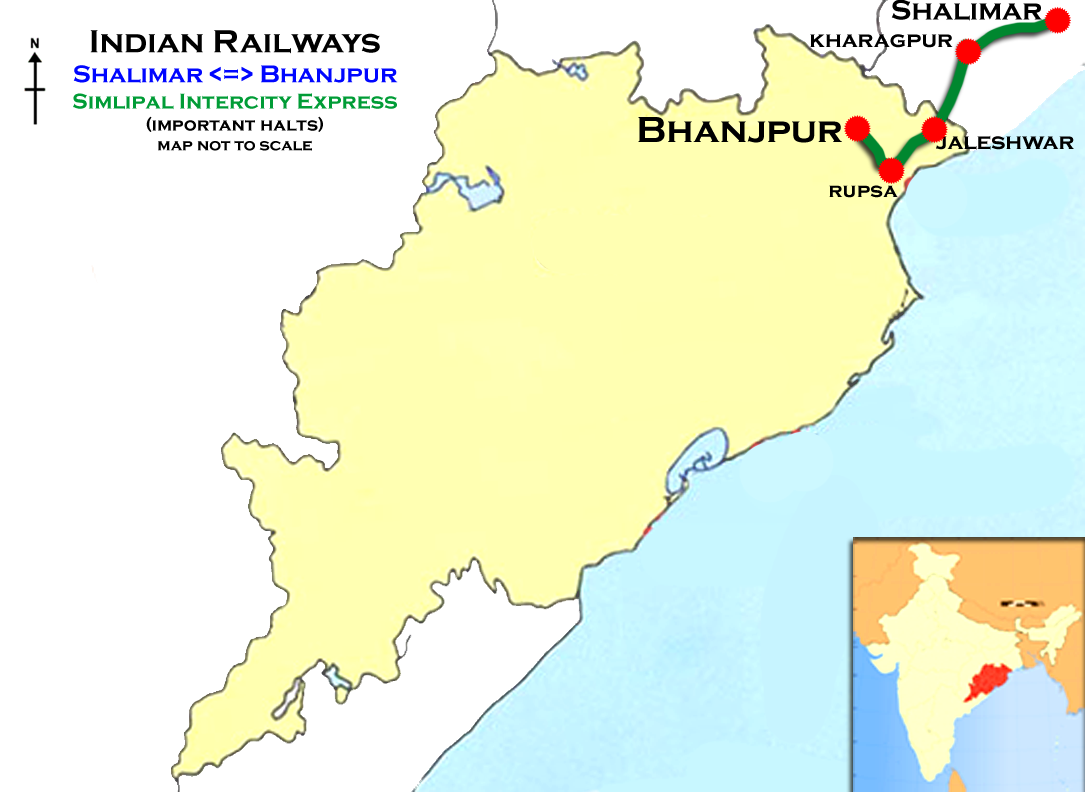

The 18007 / 18008 Simlipal Intercity Express is an express train belonging to the South Eastern Railway zone of Indian Railways. It runs between Shalimar and Bhanjpur in India.

It operates as train number 18007 from Shalimar to Bhanjpur and as train number 18008 in the reverse direction serving the states of West Bengal and Odisha.

== Coaches ==
The train has six general unreserved and two SLR (seating with luggage rake) coaches . It does not carry a pantry car coach.

As is customary with most train services in India, coach composition may be amended at the discretion of Indian Railways depending on demand.

== Service ==
The 18007 Shalimar - Bhanjpur Simlipal Intercity Express covers the distance of 266 km (165 mi) in 5 hours 5 mins (52.3 km/h) and in 6 hours 0 mins as the 18008 Bhanjpur - Shalimar Simlipal Intercity Express (44.3 km/h).

As the average speed of the train is less than 55 km/h (34 mph), as per railway rules, it doesn't include a Superfast surcharge but due to unreserved coaches it includes unreserved surcharge.

== Routing ==
The train runs from Shalimar via Santragachi Junction, Panskura, Kharagpur Junction, Belda, Jaleswar, Rupsa Junction, Baripada to Bhanjpur.

== Traction ==
As the route is fully electrified, a WAP-4 electric locomotive from the Santragachi Loco Shed hauls the train for its entire journey.
