= Kapilas Road Junction railway station =

Railway station on the East Coast Railway network, India

Kapilas Road Junction

General information
- Location: Kapilas Road, Odisha; India
- Coordinates: 20°33′32″N 85°59′44″E
- System: Indian Railways station
- Owner: Ministry of Railways, Indian Railways
- Line: Howrah–Chennai main line
- Platforms: 5
- Tracks: 6

Construction
- Structure type: Standard (on ground)
- Parking: No

Other information
- Status: Functioning
- Station code: KIS
- Zone(s): East Coast Railway
- Division(s): Khurda Road
Location
- Location within India Location within Odisha

Kapilas Road Junction railway station is a railway station on the East Coast Railway network in the Cuttack district of Odisha, India. It serves Kapilas Road. Its code is KIS. It has five platforms. Passenger, MEMU, Express trains halt at Kapilas Road Junction railway station.

== Major trains ==
- Sri Jagannath Express
