= Bhanjpur railway station =

Railway station in India

Bhanjpur
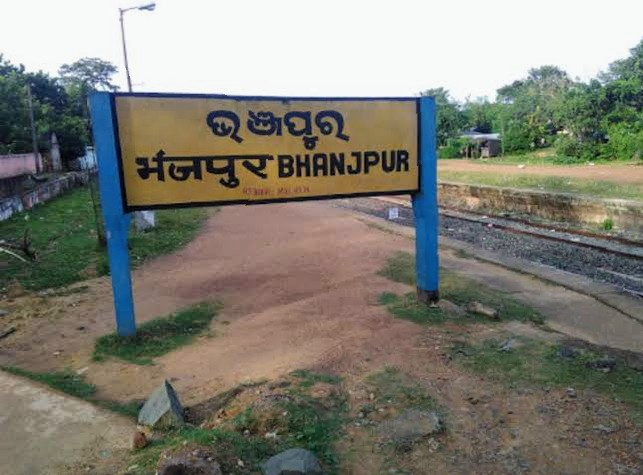

General information
- Location: Bhanjpur, Baripada, Odisha; India
- Coordinates: 21°57′24″N 86°44′04″E
- Elevation: 49 m (161 ft)
- System: Indian Railways station
- Owner: Ministry of Railways, Indian Railways
- Operator: South Eastern Railway
- Line: Howrah–Chennai main line
- Platforms: 2
- Tracks: 2

Construction
- Structure type: Standard (on ground)
- Parking: No

Other information
- Status: Functioning
- Station code: VZR
- Zone(s): South Eastern Railway
- Division(s): Kharagpur
Location
- Location within India Location within Odisha

Bhanjpur railway station is a railway station on the South Eastern Railway network in the state of Odisha, India. It serves Baripada town. Its code is VZR. It has two platforms. Passenger, Express and Superfast trains halt at Bhanjpur railway station.

== Major trains ==
- 18007/18008 Simlipal Intercity Express.

== See also ==
- Mayurbhanj district
