= Jaleswar railway station =

Railway station in India

Jaleswar
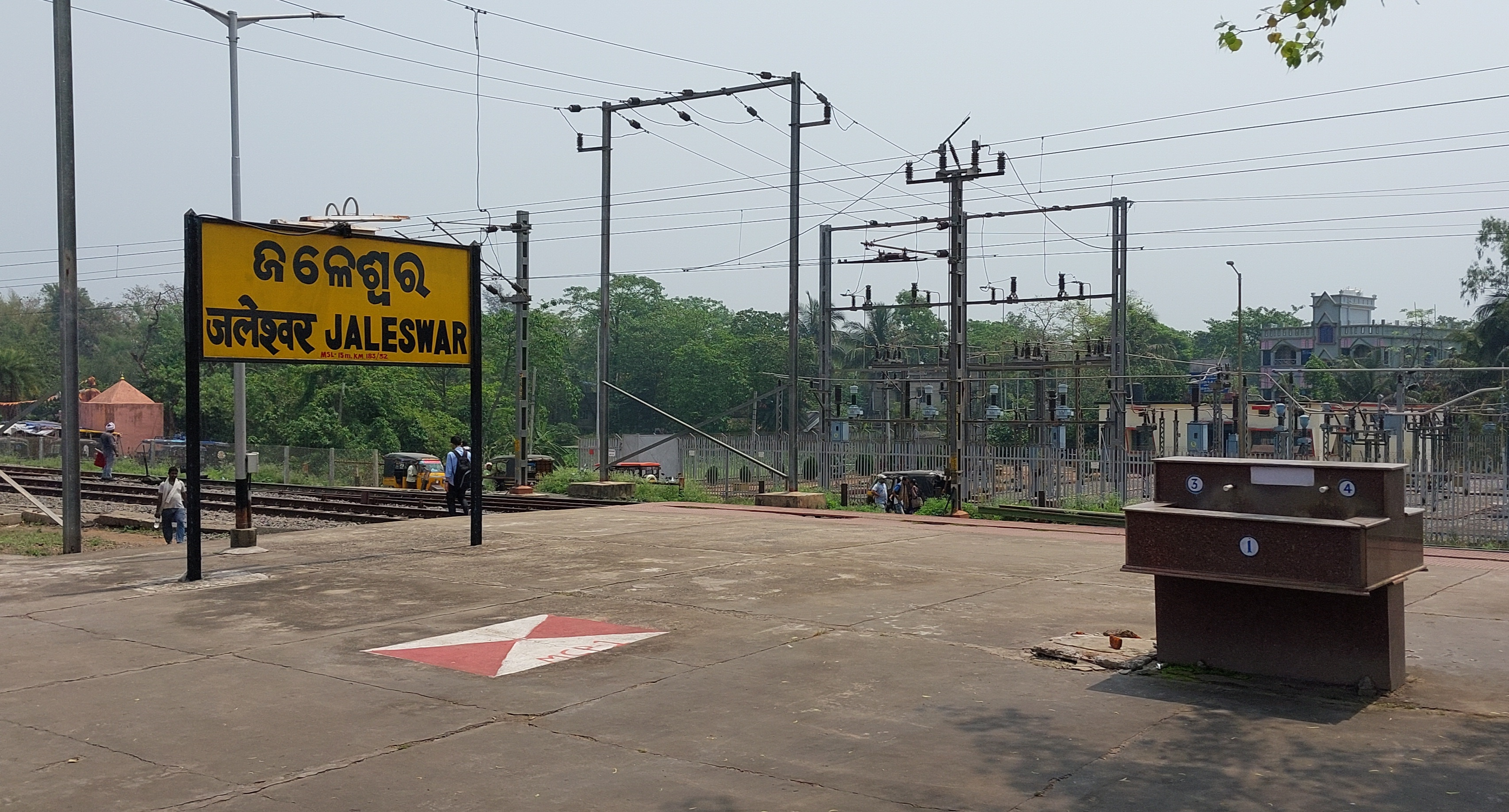

General information
- Location: Jaleswar, Odisha; India
- Coordinates: 21°47′49″N 87°13′12″E
- System: Indian Railway Station
- Owner: Ministry of Railways, Indian Railways
- Line: Howrah-Chennai main line
- Platforms: 4
- Tracks: 4

Construction
- Structure type: At grade
- Parking: No

Other information
- Status: Functioning
- Station code: JER
- Zone(s): South Eastern Railway
- Division(s): Kharagpur

Services
Preceding station	Indian Railways	Following station
Lakshannath Road towards Howrah Junction	South Eastern Railway zone Howrah–Chennai main line	Rajghat Halt towards Chennai Central
Location
- Location within India Location within Odisha

Jaleswar railway station is a railway station on the South Eastern Railway network in the state of Odisha, India. It serves Jaleswar town. Its code is JER. It has four platforms. Passenger, Express and Superfast trains halt at Jaleswar railway station.

== Major Trains ==
- Kalinga Utkal Express
- Sri Jagannath Express
- Dhauli Express
- East Coast Express
- Simlipal Intercity Express
- Ernakulam - Patna Express (via Chennai)
- Samudra Kanya Express
- Digha - Visakhapatnam Express
- Santragachi - Paradeep Express
- Nandan Kanan Express
- Odisha Sampark Kranti Express
- Bhubaneswar - Howrah Jan Shatabdi Express
- Neelachal Express
- Shalimar - Chennai Central Weekly SF Express
- Santragachi - Mangalore Central Vivek Express
- Purulia - Villupuram Superfast Express
- Santragachi - Tirupati Express

== See also ==
- Balasore district
