= Sri Jagannath Express =

Train in India

Overview
- Service type: Express
- First service: 2 June 1976; 49 years ago
- Current operator: East Coast Railway

Route
- Termini: Puri (PURI); Kolkata Shalimar (SHM)
- Stops: 19
- Distance travelled: 497 km (309 mi)
- Average journey time: 9 hours 45 mins
- Service frequency: Daily
- Train number: 18409 / 18410

On-board services
- Classes: AC 2 Tier, AC 3 Tier, Sleeper class, General unreserved
- Seating arrangements: Yes
- Sleeping arrangements: Yes
- Catering facilities: E-catering only
- Observation facilities: Large windows
- Baggage facilities: Available
- Other facilities: Below the seats

Technical
- Rolling stock: ICF rakes
- Track gauge: Broad Gauge
- Operating speed: 53 km/h (33 mph) average including halts.

Sri Jagannath Express is an express train belonging to Indian Railways – East Coast Railway zone that runs between Puri & Shalimar in India. It operates as train number 18410 from Puri to Kolkata Shalimar and as train number 18409 in the reverse direction, serving the states of Odisha and West Bengal. It is named after the Sri Jagannath temple located at Puri in the state of Odisha.

== Service ==
The 18410 Puri–Kolkata Shalimar Sri Jagannath Express covers the distance of 500 km (310 mi) in 9 hours 45 mins & in 9 hours 55 mins as 18409 Kolkata Shalimar–Puri Sri Jagannath Express. From 14.01.2022, the terminating and originating station of 18410 and 18409 Sri Jagannath Express respectively, has been changed to Kolkata Shalimar instead of Howrah Junction.

== Halts ==
- Sakhigopal
- Khurda Road Junction
- Bhubaneswar
- Barang Junction
- Cuttack Junction
- Kapilas Road Junction
- Jajpur Keonjhar Road
- Bhadrak
- Soro
- Balasore
- Rupsa Junction
- Basta
- Jaleswar
- Belda
- Kharagpur Junction
- Mecheda
- Santragachi Junction

== Coach position ==
Loco	1	2	3	4	5	6	7	8	9	10	11	12	13	14	15	16	17	18	19	20	21	22	23
	SLR	GEN	S1	S2	S3	S4	S5	S6	S7	S8	S9	S10	S11	S12	S13	S14	B1	B2	A1	A2	GEN	GEN	SLR

== Traction ==
As the route is fully electrified, a Santragachi Loco Shed-based WAP-4 or WAP-7 electric locomotive powers the train for its entire journey.

== Rake sharing ==
Previously 18410 / 09 Puri–Howrah Sri Jagannath Express used to share its rake with the 12859 / 60 Gitanjali Express. Now it runs without any rake sharing arrangement.

== Operation ==
18409 Kolkata Shalimar–Puri Express runs from Kolkata Shalimar on a daily basis, reaching Puri the next day.

18410 Puri–Kolkata Shalimar Express runs from Puri on a daily basis reaching Kolkata Shalimar the next day.
