= Baripada =

City in Odisha, India

- City
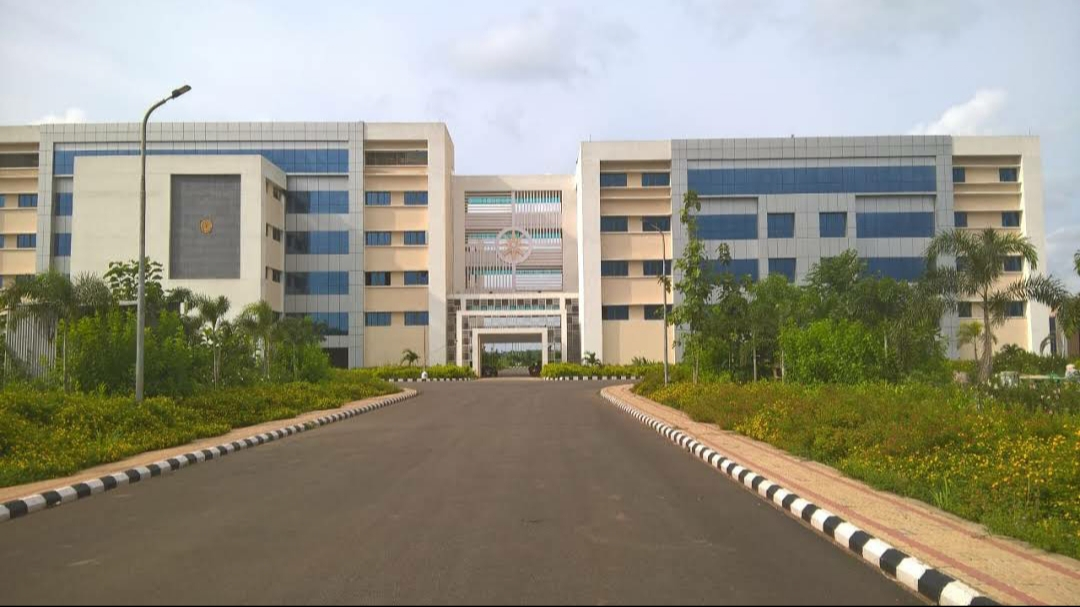
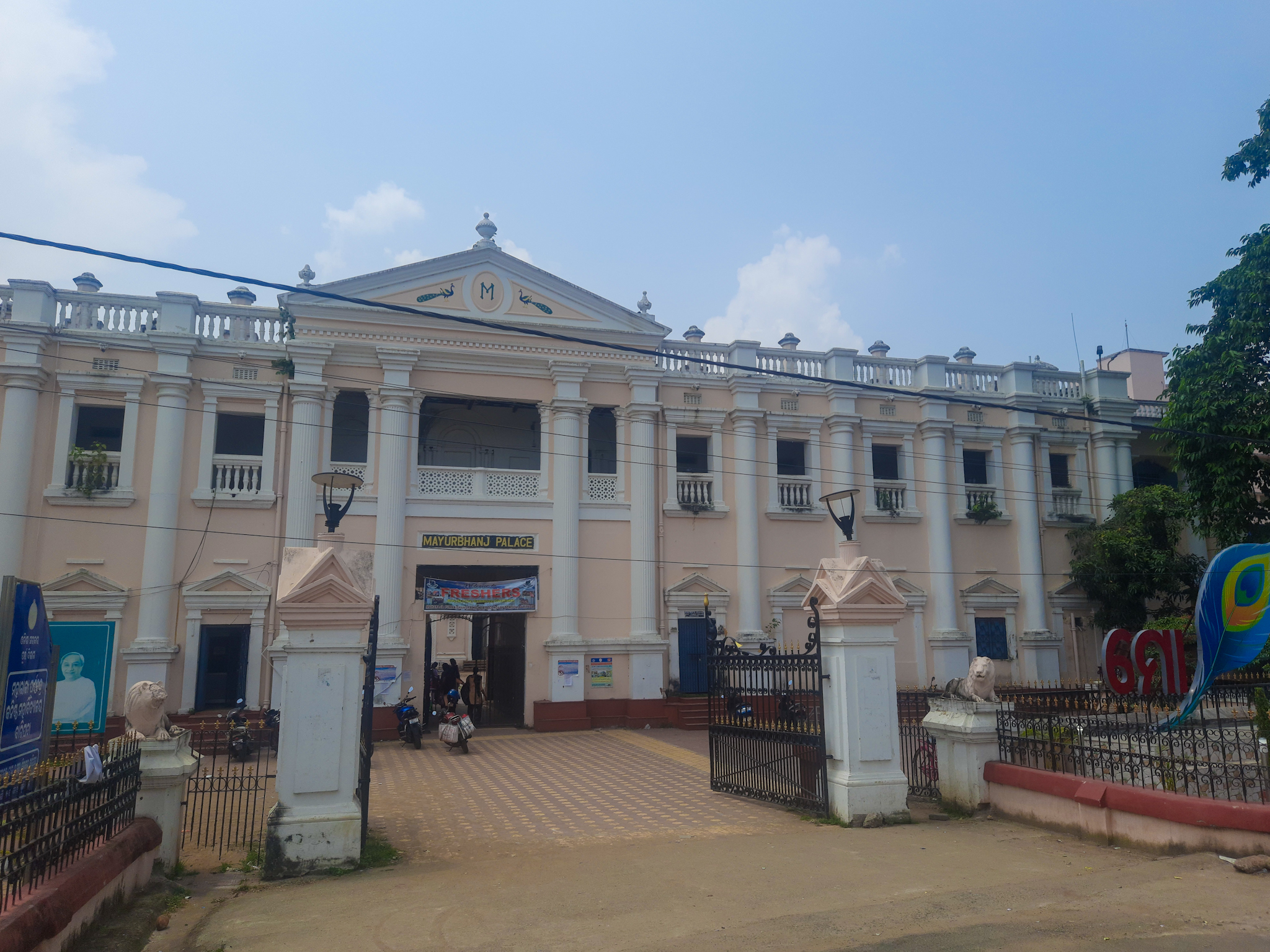
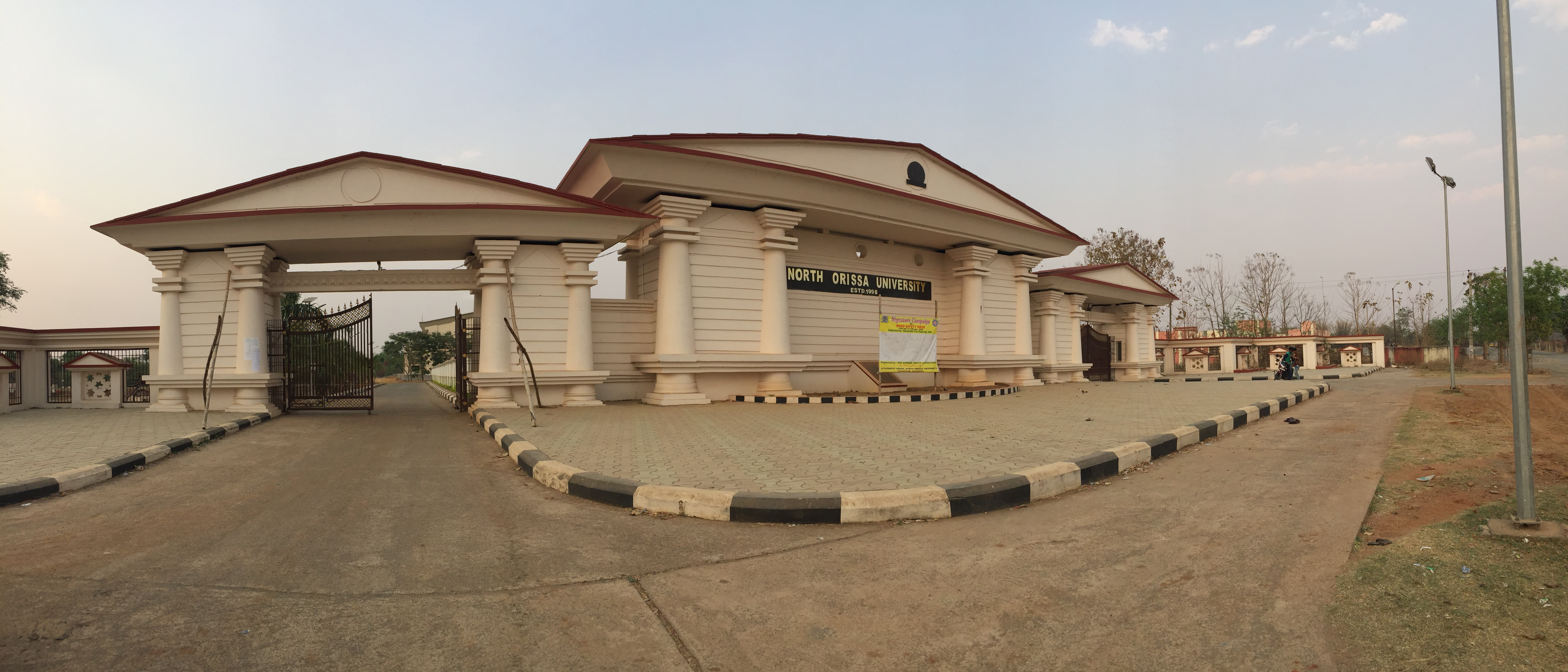
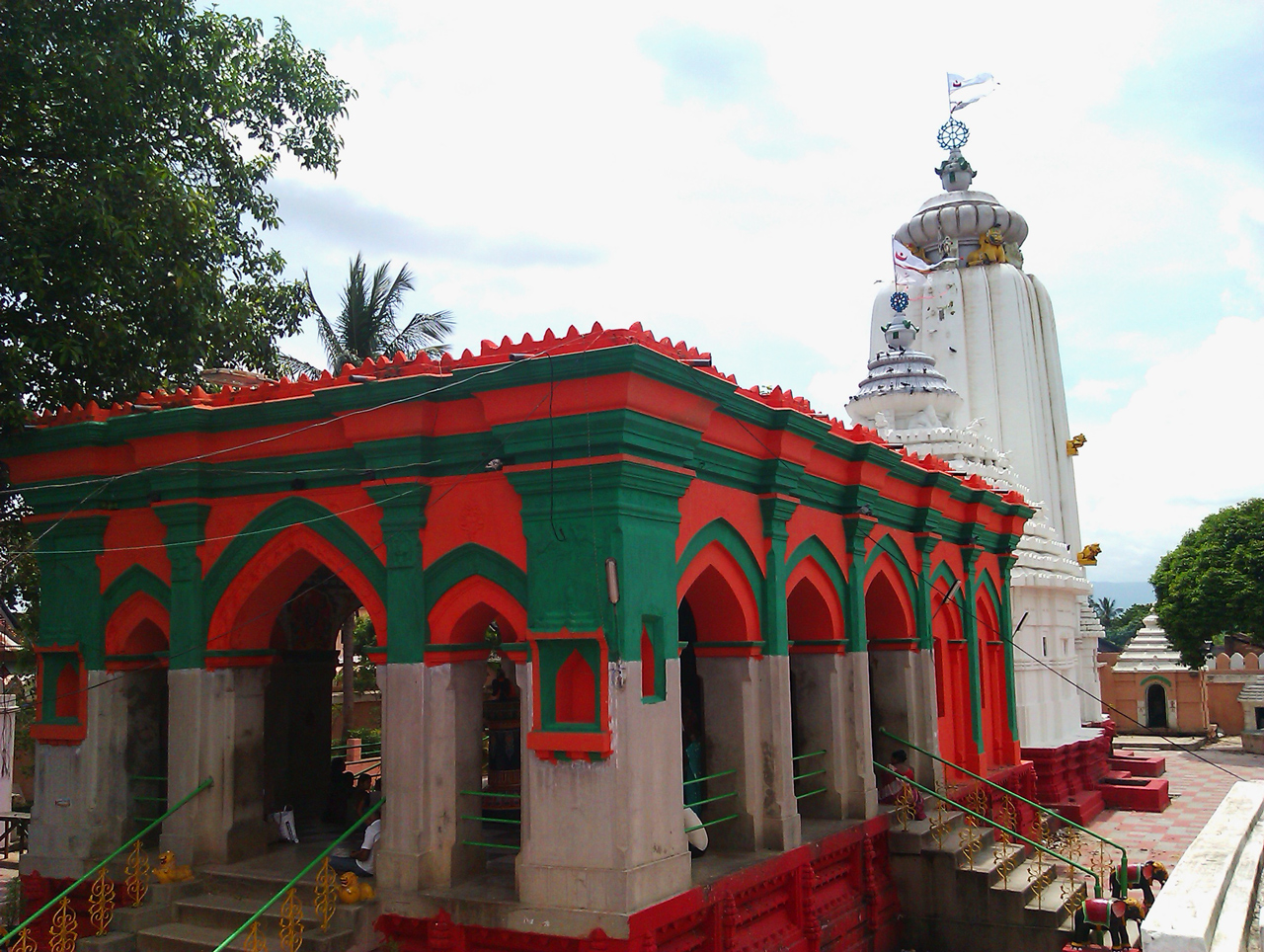
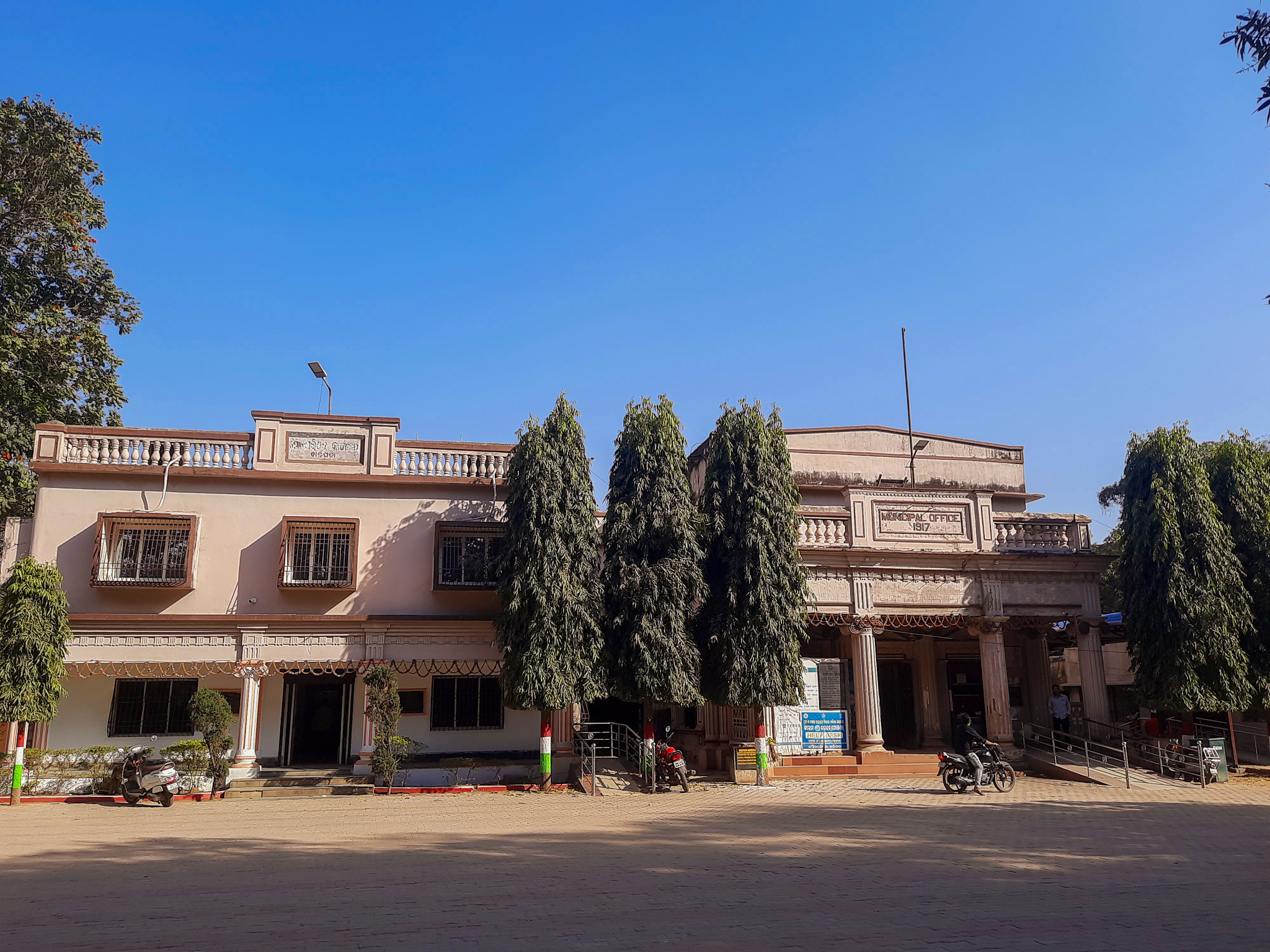
- Zigzag from top-left: Jagannath Temple, Mayurbhanj Palace, MSCB University, PRM Medical College and Hospital, Baripada Municipal Office

- Location within Odisha Location within India Location within Asia
- Coordinates: 21.94°N 86.72°E
- Country: India
- State: Odisha
- District: Mayurbhanj
- First settled: c. 1569
- Founded by: Sumitra Devi Bhanjadeo (then Ruler of Mayurbhanj)

Government
  - Type: Municipality
  - Body: Baripada Municipality

Area
  - Total: 33 km^{2} (13 sq mi)
- Elevation: 36 m (118 ft)

Population (2011)
  - Total: 116,874
  - Rank: India 446th, Odisha 8th
  - Density: 3,500/km^{2} (9,200/sq mi)

Language
  - Official: Odia
- Time zone: UTC+5:30 (IST)
- PIN: 757 0xx
- Telephone code: 06792-25xxxx 06792-26xxxx
- Vehicle registration: OD-11x-xxxx
- Sex ratio: 931 ♂/♀
- Literacy: 89.31%
- Website: baripadamunicipality.in

Baripada (bāripadā) is a city and a municipality in Mayurbhanj district in the state of Odisha, India. Located along the east bank of the Budhabalanga river, Baripada is the cultural centre of north Odisha.

In recent years, it has emerged as an educational hub with the opening of numerous professional colleges.

The city is the headquarters of Mayurbhanj district, Odisha's largest district by area. It houses the office of the District collector, the Superintendent of Police and the Court of the District and Sessions Judge.

== Etymology ==
Baripada is an Odia word meaning "land of water", the word "bāri" meaning water in Odia. It refers to the large number of ponds, water bodies and Budhabalanga river that flows through the city.

In another version, it is believed that the name probably derived from the Bauri or Bathudi tribe.

== History ==
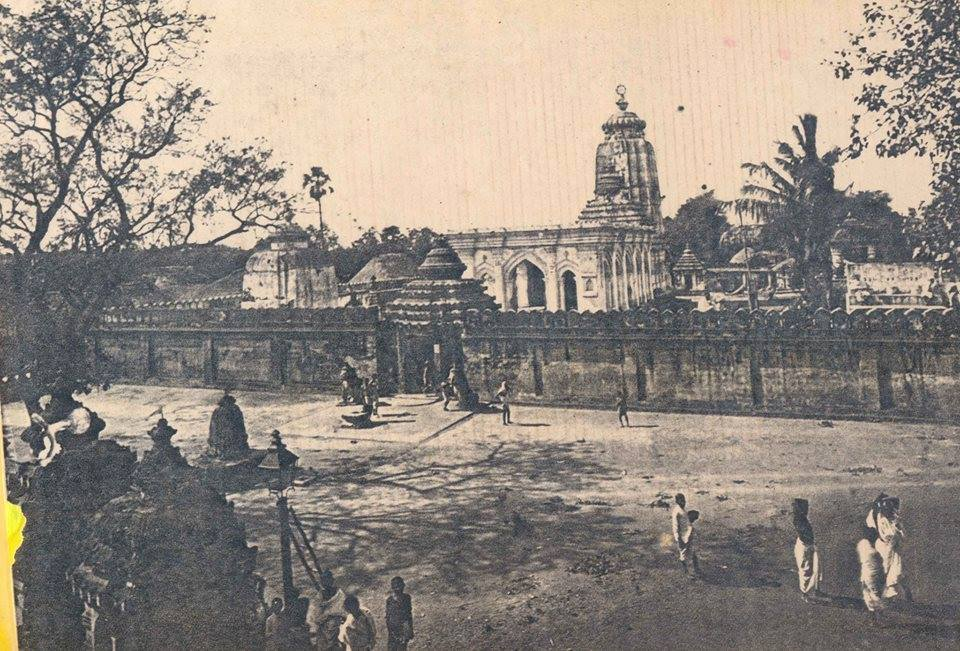
Baripada Jagannath Temple, construction started in 1569CE in kalingan architecture

Baripada became the headquarters of the state (now district) at the end of the 18th century during Sumitra Devi's rule, succeeding its earlier status in Haripur. However, it was initially documented as Burpuddah by Major James Rennell of the East India Company in his renowned 1779 Atlas, well before it assumed the role of the state headquarters.

The ruins of an old mud fort in the centre of the city have completely disappeared. A temple dedicated to Ambika Devi is the sole survivor. The chief shrine of the town is a Jagannath temple dating from 1575 AD. It is also the oldest structure in the area. A statue of the Buddhist deity Lokeshvara housed in one of its rooms is even older. However, Baripada developed into a town only under the rule of Maharaja Jadunatha Bhanja who died in 1863. His successors, especially Maharaja Sriram Chandra Bhanj Deo, added many other public infrastructure to the town. Baripada was linked to Rupsa in Balasore district through a narrow gauge line known as the Mayurbhanj State Railway in the first decade of the 20th century. This provided a major impetus to trade and commerce.

The city continued to grow after the merger of Mayurbhanj State with the Union of India in 1949. In contrast to the planned nature of the town centre, the newer areas have tended to adopt a sprawling nature.

== Geography ==
Baripada is at 21.94°N 86.72°E. It has an average elevation of 36 metres (118 feet). The city lies along the Budhabalanga River.

Climate data for Baripada, Odisha (1991–2020, extremes 1955–2020)
Month	Jan	Feb	Mar	Apr	May	Jun	Jul	Aug	Sep	Oct	Nov	Dec	Year
Record high °C (°F)	34.7 (94.5)	39.9 (103.8)	44.6 (112.3)	46.4 (115.5)	48.3 (118.9)	47.8 (118.0)	40.6 (105.1)	39.0 (102.2)	39.6 (103.3)	39.6 (103.3)	36.1 (97.0)	32.7 (90.9)	48.3 (118.9)
Mean daily maximum °C (°F)	26.1 (79.0)	30.3 (86.5)	35.4 (95.7)	38.0 (100.4)	37.8 (100.0)	35.2 (95.4)	32.2 (90.0)	32.0 (89.6)	32.3 (90.1)	31.5 (88.7)	29.0 (84.2)	26.4 (79.5)	32.2 (90.0)
Mean daily minimum °C (°F)	12.6 (54.7)	16.1 (61.0)	20.5 (68.9)	24.0 (75.2)	25.3 (77.5)	25.8 (78.4)	25.5 (77.9)	25.4 (77.7)	24.8 (76.6)	22.2 (72.0)	17.4 (63.3)	12.7 (54.9)	20.9 (69.6)
Record low °C (°F)	5.0 (41.0)	6.8 (44.2)	11.6 (52.9)	15.2 (59.4)	17.5 (63.5)	18.9 (66.0)	20.0 (68.0)	19.0 (66.2)	18.5 (65.3)	11.5 (52.7)	7.6 (45.7)	5.0 (41.0)	5.0 (41.0)
Average rainfall mm (inches)	18.9 (0.74)	18.5 (0.73)	31.7 (1.25)	69.3 (2.73)	135.8 (5.35)	267.1 (10.52)	320.8 (12.63)	367.5 (14.47)	285.4 (11.24)	176.2 (6.94)	16.8 (0.66)	8.5 (0.33)	1,716.5 (67.58)
Average rainy days	1.3	1.3	2.1	4.6	7.3	11.9	15.5	16.5	13.0	6.0	1.2	0.5	81.2
Average relative humidity (%) (at 17:30 IST)	60	54	52	57	63	75	84	86	85	78	69	62	69
Source: India Meteorological Department

== Demographics ==
Historical population
Year	Pop.	±%
1891	3,394	—
1901	5,613	+65.4%
1911	5,968	+6.3%
1921	6,189	+3.7%
1931	6,193	+0.1%
1941	8,281	+33.7%
1951	9,277	+12.0%
1961	20,301	+118.8%
1971	28,725	+41.5%
1981	52,989	+84.5%
1991	69,240	+30.7%
2001	100,651	+45.4%
2011	110,058	+9.3%
The significant population rise in the 1961 census is attributed to the incorporation of nearby two square mile areas into the Baripada town in 1952. Source: Census of Mayurbhanj State & Census of India

As of the 2011 census of India, Baripada had a population of 110,058 of which 57,008 were males and 53,050 were females and the urban agglomeration had a population of 116,874, with 60,535 males and 56,339 females. The municipality had a sex ratio of 931 females per 1,000 males and 9% of the population were under six years old. Effective literacy was 89.31%; male literacy was 93.45% and female literacy was 84.88%.

=== Population ===
The population of Baripada city includes Odias. The rest of the population includes Bengalis, Biharis, Marwaris, Punjabis, and other North Indians. The nearby villages have a major number of tribal population including Santhals and Hos.

=== Religions ===
Religions in Baripada town (2011)
Religion	Percent
Hinduism	93.91%
Islam	4.49%
Christianity	0.56%
Sikhism	0.11%
Unclassified sect.	0.69%
Not stated	0.22%

According to the 2011 census, in Baripada town, Hindus comprised the majority at 109,732, followed by Muslims at 5,241, Christians at 650, Sikhs at 130, Buddhists at 14, Jains at 20, and unclassified sects at 805, while 257 did not state their religious affiliation.

=== Languages ===
Languages spoken in Baripada (2011)
1. Odia (80.9%)
2. Santali (5.67%)
3. Hindi (4.17%)
4. Bengali (2.44%)
5. Urdu (2.34%)
6. Mundari (2.25%)
7. Bhumij (0.50%)
8. Kurmali (0.46%)
9. Nepali (0.26%)
10. Other (1.05%)

== Politics ==
Current MLA from Baripada Assembly Constituency is Prakash Soren of BJP, who won the seat in State elections of 2019. Previous MLAs from this seat were

- 2019: Prakash Soren (BJP)
- 2014: Sananda Marndi (BJD)
- 2009: Sananda Marndi (BJD)
- 2004: Bimal Lochan Das (JMM)
- 2000: Kishore Das (JMM)
- 1995: Prasanna Kumar Das (Congress)
- 1990: Chhatish Chandra Dhal (Janata Dal)
- 1985: Prasanna Kumar Das (Congress)
- 1980: Prasanna Kumar Das (Congress)
- 1977: Prasanna Kumar Das (Congress)
- 1974: Pramod Chandra Bhanjadeo (Independent)
- 1971: Pramod Chandra Bhanjadeo (Independent)
- 1967: Santosh Kumar Sahu (Congress)
- 1961: Santosh Kumar Sahu (Congress)
- 1957: Harihar Mohanty (PSP) and Samal Majhi (Independent)
- 1951: Girish Chandra Ray (PSP) and Surendra Singh (Congress)

Baripada is part of Mayurbhanj Lok Sabha constituency. The current MP of Lok Sabha (2019) is Biseswar Tudu of Bharatiya Janata Party. From 2009 election year, Baripada constituency is reserved for Scheduled Tribes.

== Economics ==
Baripada is home to many forest-based products such as timber, but due to heavy deforestation the sawmills were banned within a 25 km radius. Baripada is known for Sabai grass plantations, an African grass introduced to Baripada and was first planted in Hamilton Garden that grows on red volcanic soil and has strong fibres that are used for rope making known as Bubei. It has many cashew plantation fields. Khali (plates) and Duna (bowls) making, from leaves of Sal tree leaves (Shorea robusta), is another business that local men engage in.

It has many brick kilns on the banks of river Budhabalaga, which is the only perennial river flowing through the city. Timber remains one of the major sources of income for the local populace.

== Culture ==
Baripada is popular for its art and culture. Many famous stars of Ollywood (Odia film industry) are from Baripada. Baripada is famous for the Chhau dance form, famous all over the world. The Chaitra Parva celebrated in mid-April recognises the local talents. Uttarsahi and Dakshinsahi are two main groups who perform in this festival with many other participants. Jhumar Song is popular in Baripada.

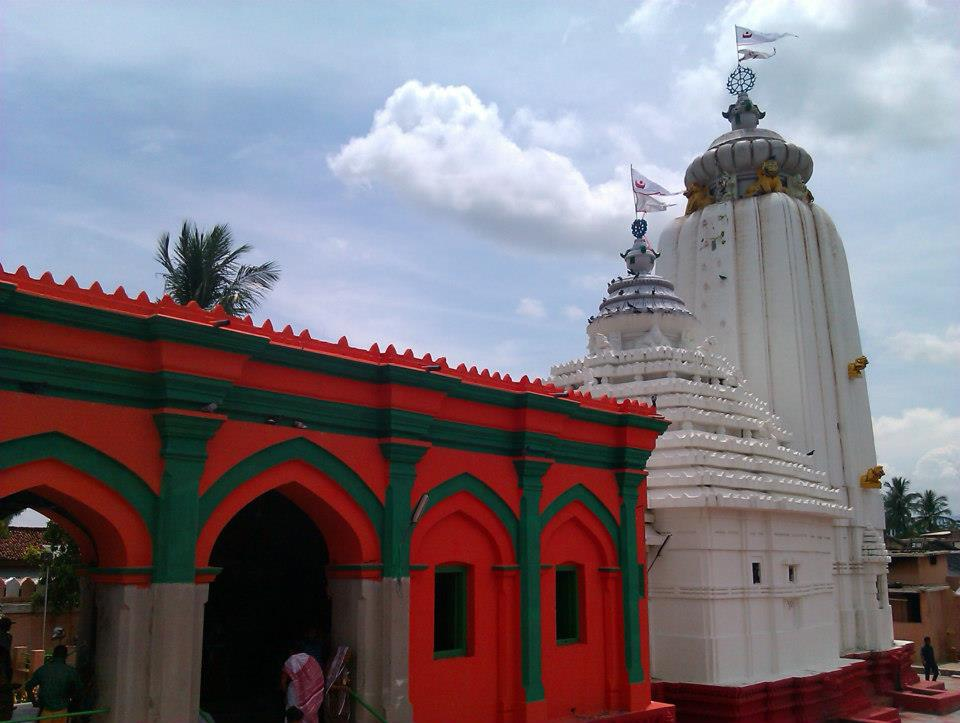
Shri Hari Baladev Jiu Temple (aka Bada Mandir), Deulasahi, Baripada

Baripada is the second place, after Puri, where the tradition of Ratha Yatra (Car festival of Lord Jagannath) began. Hence Baripada is called 'Dwitiya Srikhetra' (second Puri). Baripada's Ratha Yatra is popular for its unique tradition of allowing only women to pull the chariot of Goddess Subhadra.

Maa Ambika Temple is one of the chief temples and Maa Ambika is a highly revered deity in this region. It is in Badabazar, 1 km from Baripada bus stand.

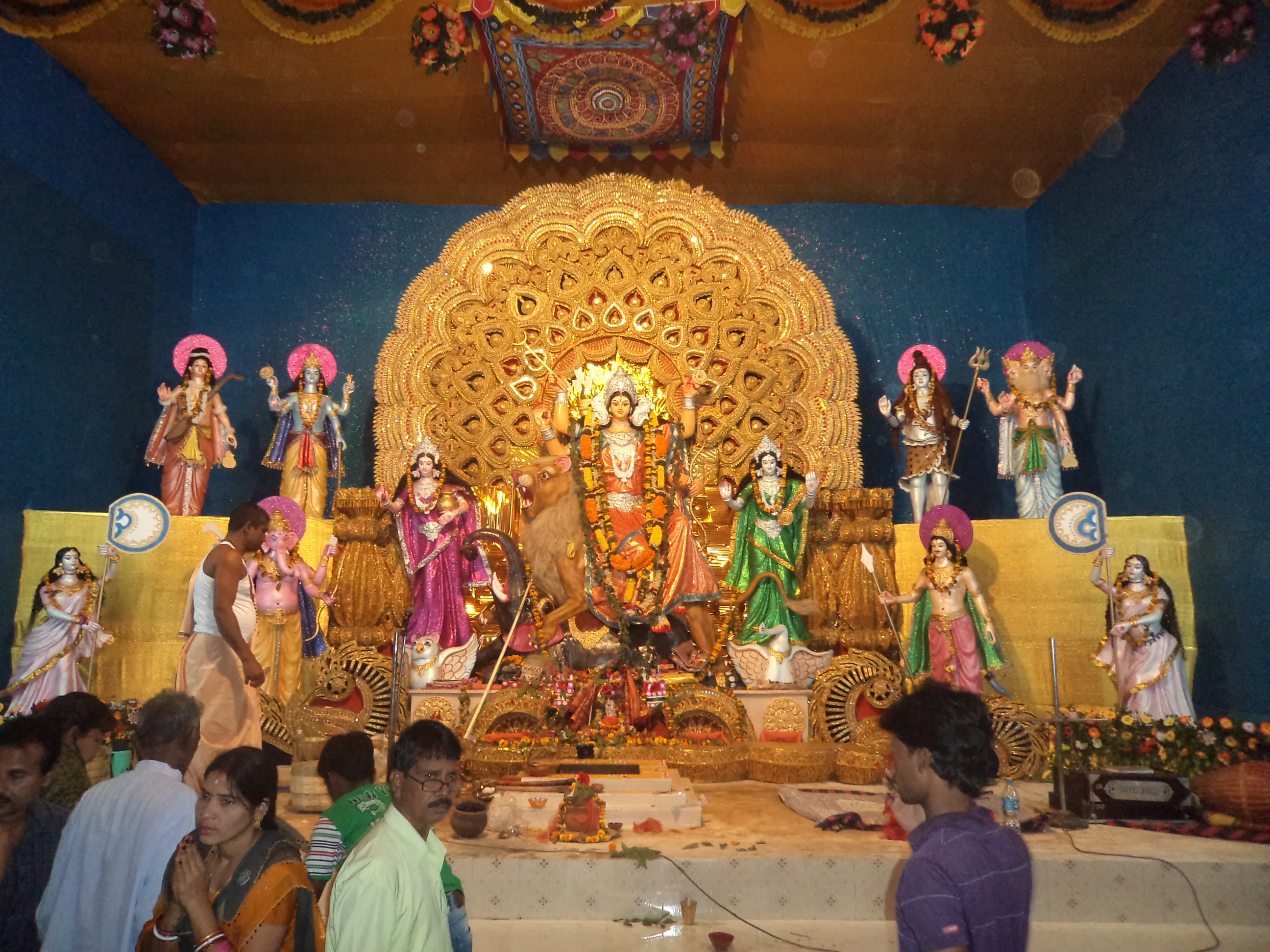
Maa Jagadhatri

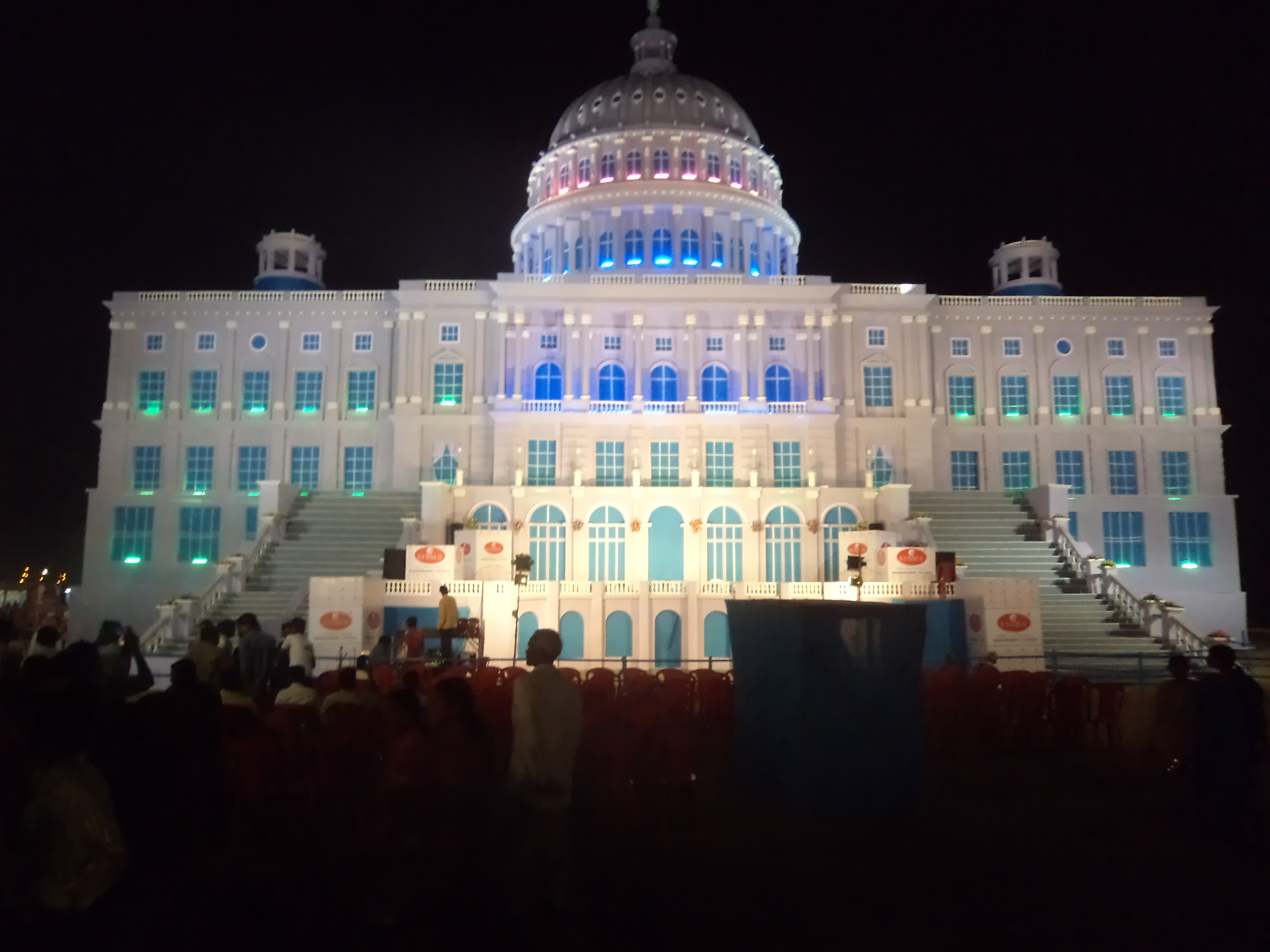
Jagadhatri Puja Torana 2011 designed as United States Capitol Building, United States

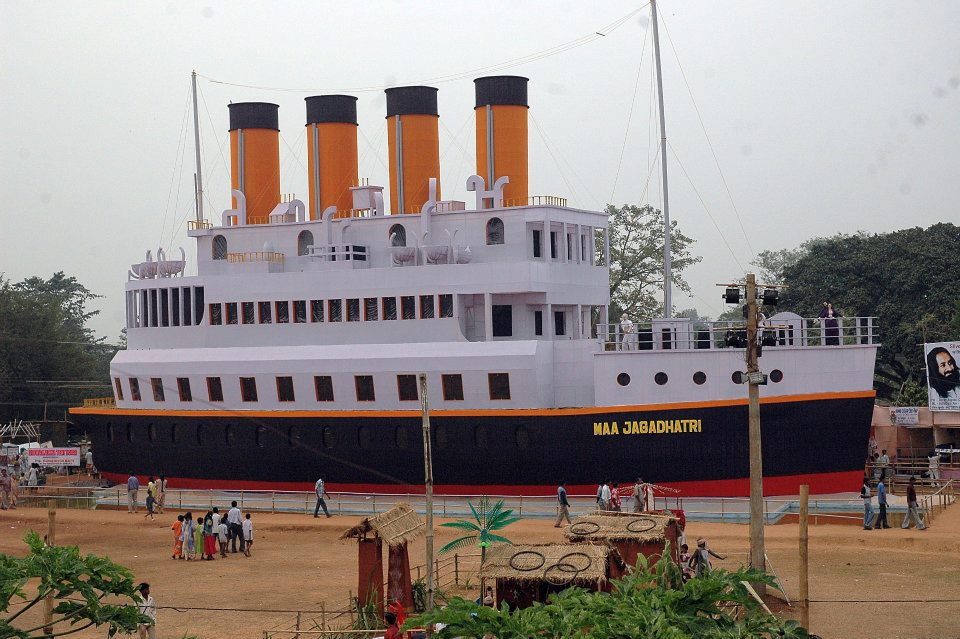
Jagadhatri Puja Torana 2006 designed as Titanic Ship

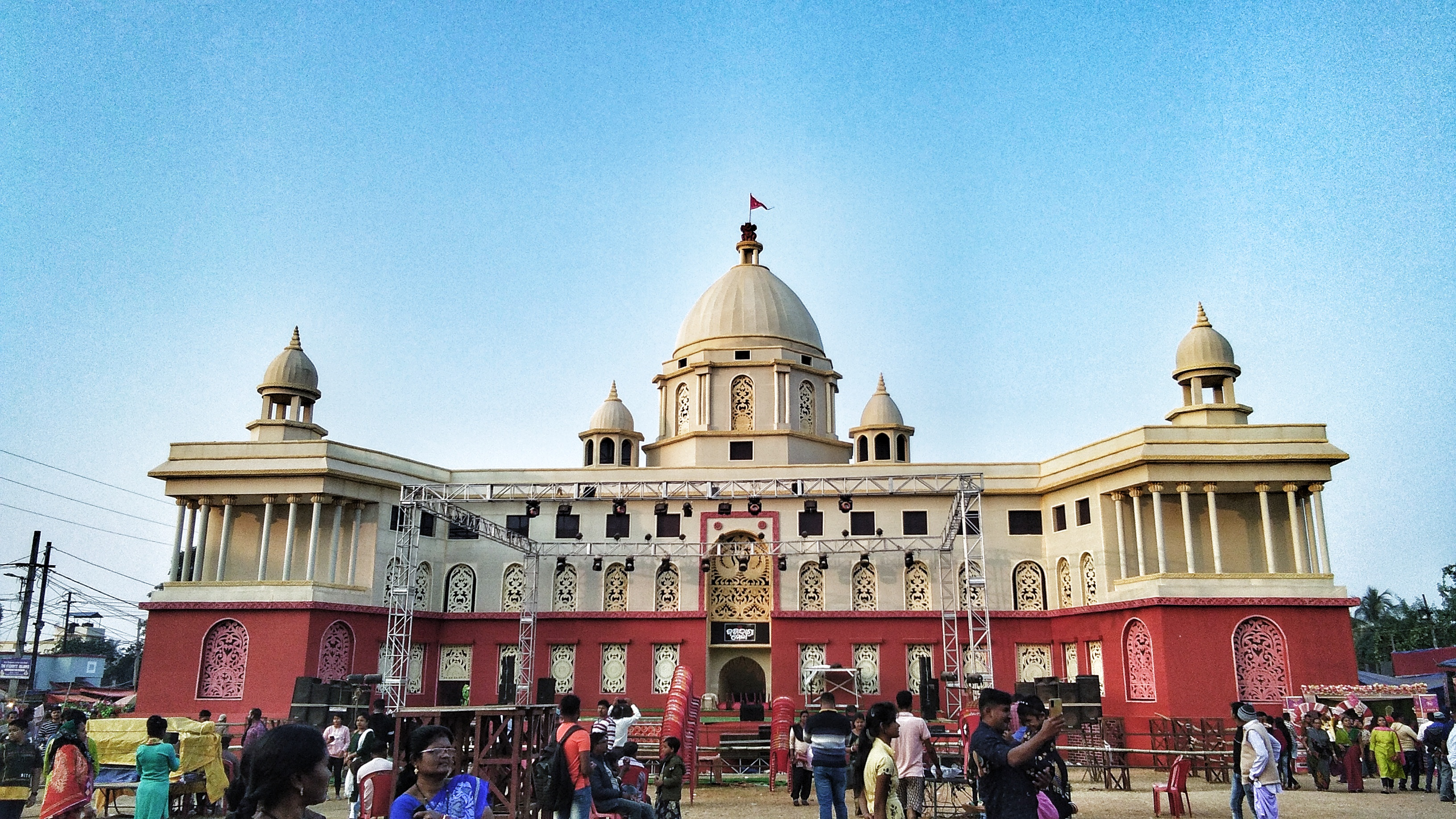
Replica of Rashtrapati Bhawan constructed for Jagadhatri Puja 2022 at Bhanjpur

Jagadhatri Mela at Bhanjpur is another big mela. It is the festival of Maa Jagadhatri, Goddess of the whole world. There is a 10–15 days mela known as mini Bali Jatra (named after Cuttack's Bali Jatra) which takes place at Jagadhatri Mela grounds, near the Bhanjpur railway Station during October–November. It is celebrated on Gosthastami. The Durga Puja in Baripada is also very popular.

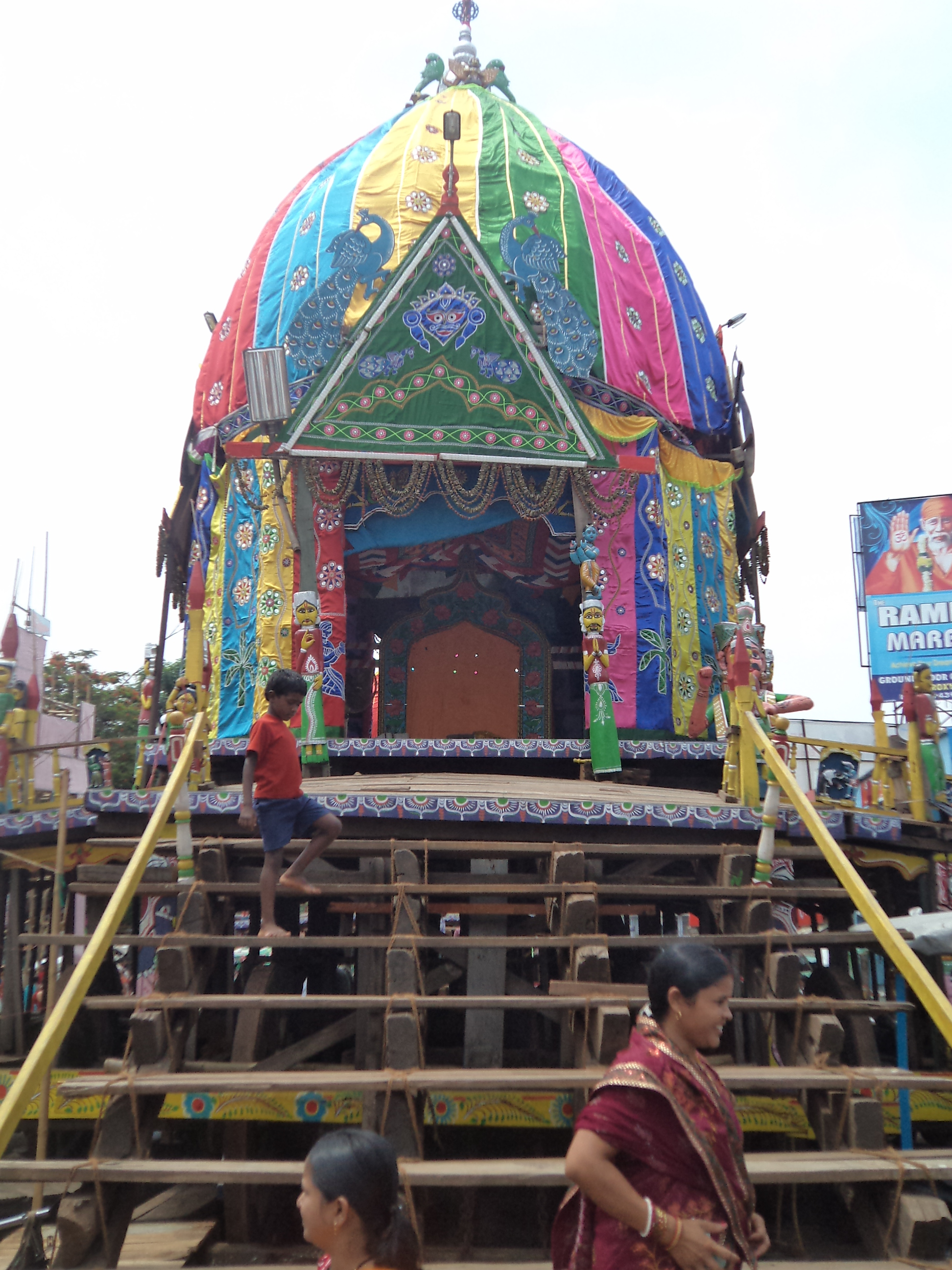
Maa Subhadra Rath of Baripada Rathyatra 2012

== Places of interest ==
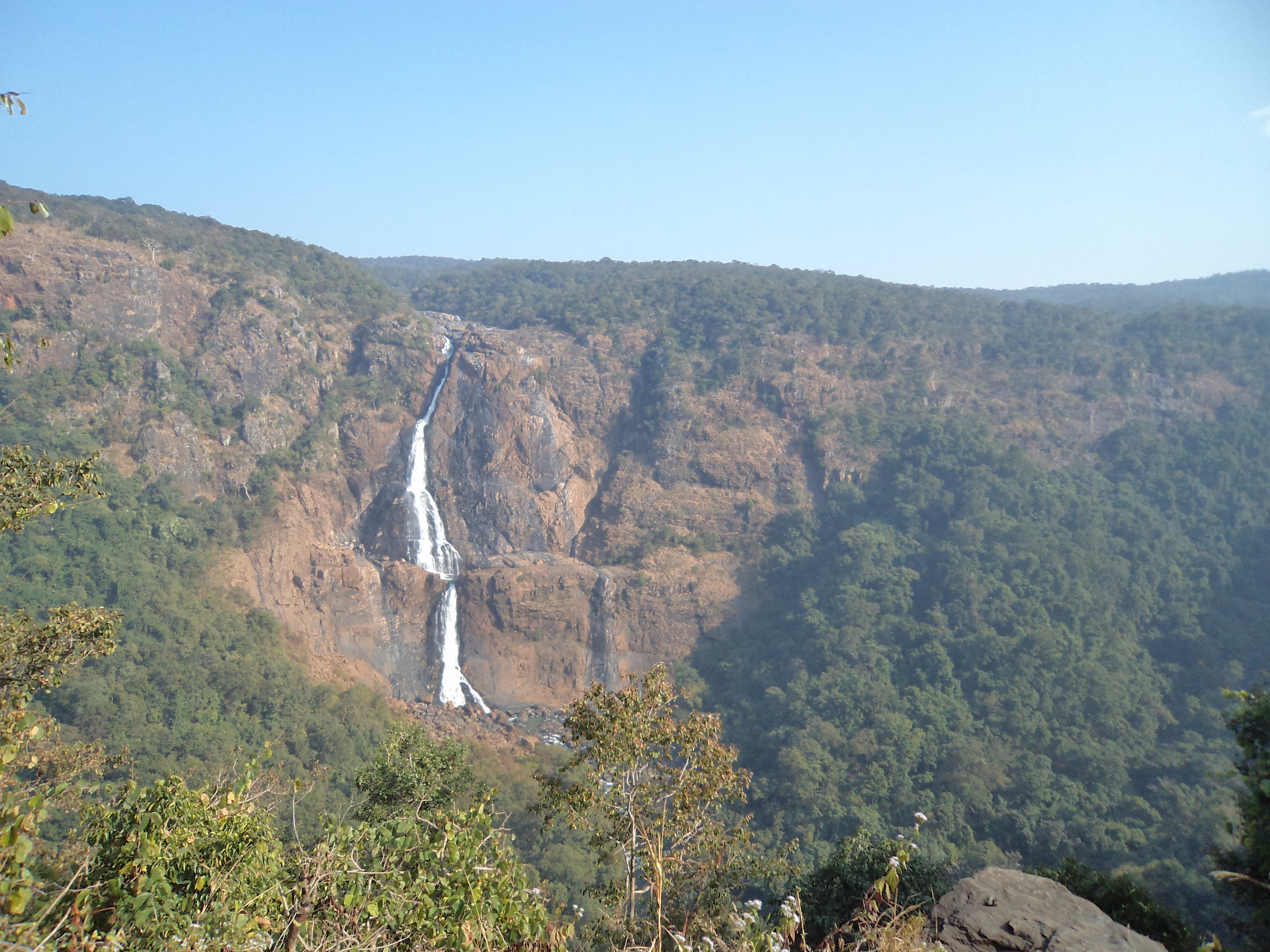
Simlipal National Park, Mayurbhanj

=== Khiching ===
Khiching is an ancient village under Sukruli block. Khiching is located about 50 km east of Keonjhargarh city 24 km west of Karanjia. The major festival in Khiching is Sivarathri, which is celebrated over seven days. The major tourist attraction of Khiching is the Maa Kichakeswari Temple. The temple was constructed during the year 920 925. Goddess Kichakeshwari was the ishtadevata and kuladevi of Bhanj dynasty as well as the deity of the Mayurbhanj princely state. The temple suffered in the hand of vandals. King of Mayurbhanj, Maharaja Pratap Chandra Bhanjdeo reconstructed the temple in the year 1934. Height of the temple is 100 ft (30 m) and total area is 1764 sq.ft. There is a museum constructed by Maharaja Purna Chandra Bhanjdeo in the year 1922.

=== Debakunda ===
Debakunda is a waterfall and tank. The Ambika temple is on the hilltop near the falls. Debakunda is at a distance of 60 km from Baripada and 85 km from Balasore.

=== Similipal ===
Similipal National Park is an elephant and tiger reserve 30 km from Baripada. It has an evergreen forest having varied flora and fauna, served with a network of perennial streams. This is a habitat for tropical birds and animals like elephants, tigers, leopards, sambar, and deer. The landscape comprises Sal forests, grasslands, peaks and waterfalls.

Similipal is the richest watershed in Odisha, giving rise to many perennial rivers. The Budhabalanga, the Khadkei, the West Deo, the East Deo, the Salandi and the Sanjo are the major ones. Barehipani (400 m) and Joranda (150 m) waterfalls are visitor attractions, and the Ramtirtha Crocodile Rearing Centre is located in nearby Jashipur.

=== Baldiha Dam ===
Government neglect has taken its toll on century-old Baldiha Dam in Shamakhunta block of Mayurbhanj district. Built on river Palpala over 205 km^{2} area, the irrigation project remains defunct for the last 20 years due to lack of renovation. The Project was undertaken during the rule of Maharaja Shri Ramchandra Bhanjdeo and the then State Engineer Jarnold Martin Loe had constructed the dam at Baldiha, 28 km (17 mi) from Baripada town.

As of 2019, 10 to 15 acres of land are being irrigated during Rabi season with the water from the dam while there is no irrigation for Kharif crop. The water level of the dam has drastically come down due to huge deposition of soil and leakages. Even water from Palpala river has failed to recharge the dam during rainy season.

=== Bhimkund ===
There is a sacred pool near the river Vaitarani. As per legend Bhima, the second Pandava, took his bath in this pool when the Pandavas were passing their incognito life in Birat Nagar (presumed to be the present location of Kaptipada). The Vaitarani river flows through a gorge in steps and flows down to the Bhimkund pool. During the Makar festival during January, thousands of people gather here to take a holy dip.

=== Manatri ===
It is best known for the shrine of 'Kakharua Baidyanath' (Temple of Lord Shiva). It is surrounded on three sides by water channels from the Gangahar River. The temple is based on the Odisha's temple architecture. During the Shivaratri festival thousands of devotees gather there. According to legend, the king of Somavanshi dynasty was affected by leucoderma and his whole body resembled with white patches like in a water melon ('kakharu' in Oriya). It is believed that he was cured by the grace of the deity. Some Odia inscriptions of Mayurbhanj royal family are seen on the temple walls.

To the west of temple in about 1 km are the remains of an ancient fort and 8 km to the east are the ruins of Kuradiha Gada.

=== Machha Kandana ===
Near Udala. Way to Podadiha village.

=== Kalo Dam ===
Situated in Nudadiha block.

=== Sunei Dam ===
10 km distance from Kaptipada, Mayurbhanj.

=== Haripur ===
Haripur, earlier known as Hariharpur, was founded by Maharaja Harihar Bhanj in 1400 CE and remained as the capital of Bhanja Dynasty before it shifted to Baripada. Baidyanath Bhanj, another ruler of the dynasty built a magnificent brick temple in honour of his tutelary God Rasika-raya. Though currently dilapidated, it is unique among the brick temples of Orissa. Towards the north to the courtyard of Rasikaraya temple lies the ruins of Ranihanspur (the inner apartment of the queen).

Radhamohan temple is a brick-built rectangular temple nearby.

=== Lulung ===
This place is surrounded on three sides by hills of Similipal range. It is a popular place for picnicking, and tourists can purchase the stone utensils that are native to this place.

=== Devagram ===
Also known as Deogan, the river Sono flows close to the village. There are several ruins of old temples on the bank of the river. It is presumed that a change in the course of the river might have caused this destruction. The images of Ganesh and Parvati with Shiva Lingam and the eight-armed Chamunda on a heap of stone are found here. The sculpture of the Goddess and the pedestal are notable for their workmanship. Fragments of stone supposed to be parts of the ruins of Chamunda temple are still lying in the river bed.

=== Samibruksha ===
Samibruksha is a peak in the hillock and is about 500 ft high. There are five caves on the western side. Legend has it that the five Pandavas hid their arms in these caves before proceeding to the court of the king Virata. The pilgrims take their sacred bath in the nearby stream on Baruni day in the month of Chaitra. Makar Sankranti, which falls in mid-January, is the most important festival of this place.

=== Simla ===
Simla on the banks of river Burhabalanga is houses the shrine of Simileswar Shiva. Hundreds of pilgrims visit the shrine every day, and this place is famous with picnickers. A fair is held during the Shivaratri day which continues for a week.

=== Kuchei ===
This is an excavated prehistoric site and discoveries pertaining to Neolithic possessions of man are being made. The pottery fragments found with Neolithic implements speak of settlements in the late Stone Age in Mayurbhanj district.

=== Kuliana ===
Many paleolithic artefacts are being discovered in this region. Its very near to West Bengal's Medinipore.

=== Sitakund Waterfall ===
The Sitakund waterfall is another outside attraction tourist place of Simlipal Tiger reserve of Odisha. The Sitakund waterfall is located at Mayurbhanj district of Odisha and it is the part of the Simlipal National Park. Also this place is the place of Hinduism because the name of the waterfall is Sitakund that is the name of Hindu goddess Sita Devi.

== Transportation ==
Baripada railway station was one of the earliest stations in Odisha. The ruler of Mayurbhanj, Maharaja Krushna Chandra Bhanjdeo, connected Baripada to the Howrah-Chennai railway corridor by a narrow-gauge rail network, then known as the Mayurbhanj State Railway. The first ever airport during the British Raj in Odisha stands to this date at sites of Rajabasa (16 km from city) and Rasgovindpur (60 km from the city) with their 2 km-long runways which were constructed during World War II.

Baripada — Rupsa — Balasore DEMU Pgr. train and a superfast express train to the state capital Bhubaneswar runs on daily basis. There's also a weekly train that runs from Baripada to Puri directly. A new train to Kolkata from Baripada has been running since 2010. The city has also a suburban railway station at Bhanjpur named Bhanjpur railway station.

Regarding road transport, buses are a popular means of transportation between the cities. There is connectivity to Bhubaneswar, Puri, Sambalpur, Jharsuguda, Rourkela, Keonjhar, Balasore, Angul, Bolangir, Bhadrak, Cuttack, Jamshedpur, Kharagpur, Ranchi and Kolkata from here. The city is 3 km from the starting point of N.H. 5 (now N.H. 18) which goes to Chennai. There are a wide range of taxis for sightseeing and tours.

== Education ==
Baripada is the seat for MSCB Public University at Takatpur. It is home to the Maharaja Purna Chandra Junior College which provides higher secondary education in Humanities, Science, and Commerce stream to more than 2000 students. It is also home to the Maharaja Purna Chandra Autonomous College, Baripada which is one of oldest higher educational institutes in odisha and provides graduate, and postgraduate level academics in various disciplines to around 7000 students. The erstwhile Mayurbhanj Palace houses the Maharaja Purna Chandra Junior College with and Government Women's College with about 500 students.

The newly built Pandit Raghunath Murmu Medical College and Hospital started its classes from September 2017. It is located in Rangmatia, 8 km from the main town.

The oldest high school is M.K.C High School, built during 1889. The town has two Kendriya Vidyalaya schools.

The engineering college named Seemanta Engineering College, affiliated to BPUT is near Jharpokharia which is 35 km from Baripada. Mayurbhanj Law College was established in 1978.

Government Sanskrit College, Baripada, established in 1894, is the oldest Sanskrit college in Odisha and one of the oldest in India. Currently affiliated to Shree Jagannath Sanskrit University, it offers traditional Sanskrit education including Upashastri and Shastri courses, and plays a vital role in preserving classical Sanskrit scholarship in eastern India.

== City's pro-women stance ==
=== Unique women only Subhadra Ratha Yatra ===
The Baripada Rath Yatra, renowned as the second most significant after Puri's, boasts a unique tradition: only women pull the chariot of Devi Subhadra. This distinctive practice, symbolising women's empowerment, commenced in 1975 during International Women's Year. The origin of this tradition can be traced to the mid-1950s when a female devotee sustained serious injuries while attempting to touch the chariot ropes. Moved by this incident, a compassionate individual proposed to the district administration that women should exclusively pull Devi Subhadra's chariot. The then Collector and District Magistrate of Mayurbhanj, Vivekananda Patnaik, approved this proposal. Consequently, thousands of devotees assembled on Bada Danda, the grand road leading to the Haribaldev Jew temple, to participate in the chariot procession of Lord Balabhadra and Devi Subhadra.The chariot-pulling unfolds over two days. On the first day, Devi Subhadra's chariot is pulled halfway to the Gundicha temple, and the remaining journey is completed on the following day. Throughout these two days, only women are involved in pulling the Darpadalan chariot of Devi Subhadra, with a large number participating annually.

== Green infrastructure ==
=== Urban forest ===
Baripada city has an urban forest and a green zone for joggers at Palabani, located on its outskirts. Developed by the Baripada Forest Division, the urban forest spans 10 acres and features a diverse range of trees, including fruit-bearing and medicinal plants. It houses approximately 12,000 trees, including sal, mahogany, akashia, and neem, planted to provide space for jogging. The source describes this forest as unique within the state.

Prior to this development, the land was under the stewardship of the Hamilton Trust. However, due to underutilisation of the land, the trust transferred its management to the forest division. This transfer ensures that the area is effectively utilised for the benefit of the community and the environment. The forest division now assumes full responsibility for the ongoing care and maintenance of the urban forest.

== Sustainable urban energy ==
Baripada city now boasts 1 MW of solar power at the Baripada Grid substation. GEDCOL has achieved a significant milestone in the state's renewable energy sector by commissioning this 1 MW solar power plant on 12 May 2023. Plans are envisioned to upgrade the renewable energy facility to cater the growing urban power demands of Baripada city.

== Sports culture ==
The Baripada stadium has produced international athletes including Purnima Hembram, Jauna Murmu, Jabamani Soren who have brought many laurels to the State. The stadium has also the honour of hosting as many as 10 Ranji Trophy cricket matches successfully.

== Notable people ==
- Jatin Das, international painter
- Bijay Mohanty, actor in Odia language films
- Jagadish Mohanty, Odia novelist
- Uttam Mohanty, actor in Odia language films
- Jogesh Pati, Indian-American theoretical physicist at the University of Maryland, USA
