= Betnoti =

- Town
- Location in Orissa, India
- Coordinates: 21.735503°N 86.849928°E
- Country: India
- State: Odisha

Government
  - Member of Parliament: Shri Pratap Chadra Sarangi (BJP)
  - Member of Legislative Assembly: Shri Sanatan Bijuli (BJP)
- Elevation: 45 m (148 ft)

Population (2011)
  - Total: 10,000 (approx)

Languages
  - Official: Odia
- Time zone: UTC+5:30 (IST)
- Postal code: 757025
- Vehicle registration: OD 11 (Earlier OR 11)

Betnoti is a small town in the Mayurbhanj district in the state of Odisha, India. It is the block headquarter of the Betnoti block. It is 26 kilometres (16 mi) from Baripada, the district headquarters of Mayurbhanj, and 194 kilometres (121 mi) from Bhubaneswar, the capital of Odisha.

== Geography ==
Betnati located at 21.73 (latitude),86.85 (longitude) with an altitude of about 45 metres (148 ft) on the side of National Highway-18. The population is around 10,000.

== Communication ==
Betnoti is well connected by road and railway. Buses to Bhubaneswar, Kolkata, and Jamshedpur are available from here. The Bangriposi - Bhubaneswar Superfast Express, Bangriposi-Balasore DEMU run through here daily. Simlipal Intercity Express which connects Baripada & Shalimar, W.B. and passes via Betnoti, runs thrice a week.

Betnoti is about to become a "Notified Area Council". There are small-scale industries, financial institutions, national banks and utilities in the village. It manufactures sabai rope and sal-leaf plates.

== Education ==
There are many schools and colleges in Betnoti, including Betnoti College, one of the top colleges under North Orissa University which provides higher secondary, and graduate level academics in various disciplines. Other schools include Maharaja Pratap Chandra High School, Munilal High School, Sathilo High School, Jawahar Navodaya Vidyalaya, Odisha Adarsha Vidyalaya, Divyajyoti Convent School, Saraswati Shishu Vidya Mandir, Betnoti Public School, St. Xavier's High School, Vivekananda Kendra, St. Xaviar Play School and Sri Aurobinda Purnaga Sikhya Kendra 10 to 15 km away from here is also a fast growing school. There is also a residential + 2 science college in the town named Sai Birdaban Institute of Science and Technology (SIST).
