= Rupsa Junction railway station =

Railway station in India

Rupsa Junction
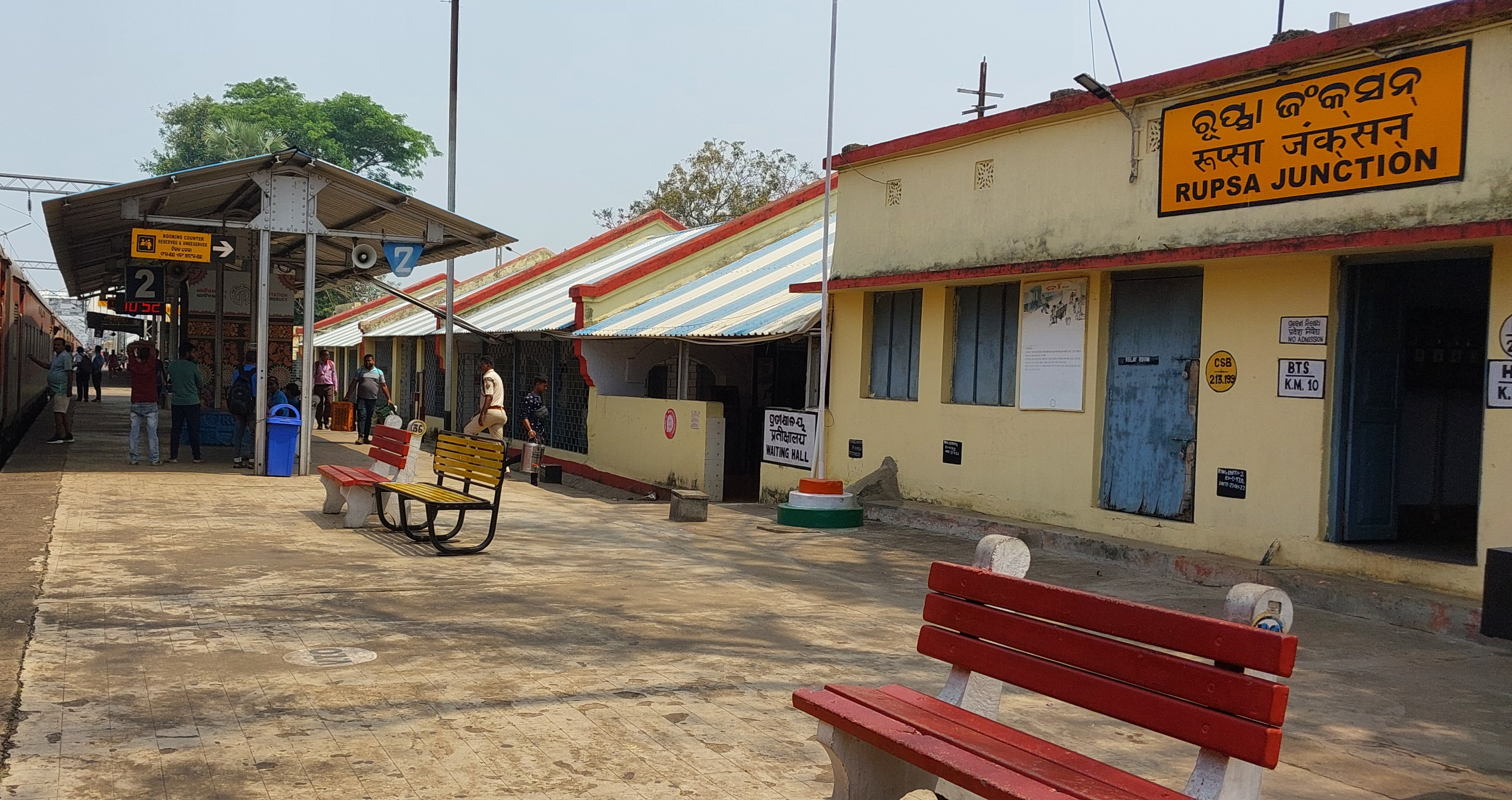
- Rupsa Junction railway station

General information
- Location: Rupsa, Odisha; India
- Coordinates: 21°37′20″N 87°01′07″E
- System: Indian Railways station
- Owner: Ministry of Railways, Indian Railways
- Line: Howrah–Chennai main line
- Platforms: 5
- Tracks: 7

Construction
- Structure type: At grade
- Parking: No

Other information
- Status: Functioning
- Station code: ROP
- Zone(s): South Eastern Railway
- Division(s): Kharagpur
Location
- Location within India Location within Odisha

Rupsa Junction railway station is a junction railway station on the South Eastern Railway network in the state of Odisha, India. It serves Rupsa town. Its code is ROP. It has five platforms. Passenger, Express and Superfast trains halt at Rupsa Junction railway station.

== Major trains ==
- Sri Jagannath Express
- East Coast Express
- Simlipal Intercity Express

== See also ==
- Balasore District
