= Bhanjpur =

Coordinates: 25°03′N 87°17′E

Bhanjpur is a place and a locality inside Baripada situated in Mayurbhanj district of Orissa, India. It is named after Bhanja Dynasty, who ruled Mayurbhanj for a long period.

After Ratha Yatra, Jagadhatri Mela at Bhanjpur is the biggest mela of Baripada. It is the festival of Maa Jagadhatri, Goddess of the whole World. There is a 7–10 days mela (carnival) known as mini Bali Yatra called after Cuttack's Bali Yatra (due to simultaneous observation during Ras Purnima) takes place at Jagadhatri Mela Podia, Bhanjpur near Bhanjpur Railway Station during October–November. It is celebrated on Gosthastami. Bhanjpur Jagadhatri mela is famous for its decoration.
