= Tatanagar–Patna Vande Bharat Express =

Mini Vande Bharat Express train route in India

Tatanagar Junction – Patna Junction Vande Bharat Express

Overview
- Service type: Vande Bharat Express
- Locale: Jharkhand and Bihar
- First service: 15 September 2024 (Inaugural); 18 September 2024; 2 years ago (Commercial)
- Current operator: South Eastern Railways (SER)

Route
- Termini: Tatanagar Junction (TATA); Patna Junction (PNBE)
- Stops: 07
- Distance travelled: (20893 / 20894 / 21895 / 21896) - 451 km (280 mi) (21893 / 21894) - 642 km (399 mi)
- Average journey time: (20893 / 20894 / 21895 / 21896) - 07 hrs 15 mins (21893/21894) - 10 hrs 25 mins
- Service frequency: Six days a week (Note: Except Tuesdays)
- Train numbers: 20893 / 20894 & 21895 / 21896 (via Gomoh Jn); 21893 / 21894 (via Barkakana Jn & Son Nagar Jn)
- Lines used: Tatanagar–Asansol line (till Chandil Jn); Chandil–Muri line; Ranchi–Netaji S.C.Gomoh line; Howrah–Gaya–Delhi line (till Gaya Jn); Gaya–Patna line

On-board services
- Classes: AC Chair Car, AC Executive Chair Car
- Seating arrangements: Airline style; Rotatable seats
- Sleeping arrangements: No
- Catering facilities: On board Catering
- Observation facilities: Large windows in all coaches
- Entertainment facilities: On-board WiFi; Infotainment System; Electric outlets; Reading light; Seat Pockets; Bottle Holder; Tray Table
- Baggage facilities: Overhead racks
- Other facilities: Kavach

Technical
- Rolling stock: Mini Vande Bharat 2.0
- Track gauge: Indian gauge 1,676 mm (5 ft 6 in) broad gauge
- Electrification: 25 kV 50 Hz AC Overhead line
- Operating speed: 21893/94/95/96 61 kmph 20893/94 59 kmph
- Average length: 192 metres (630 ft) (08 coaches)
- Track owner: Indian Railways
- Rake maintenance: Tatanagar Jn (TATA)

The Tatanagar - Patna Vande Bharat Express is India's 56th Vande Bharat Express train, connecting the industrial city of Jamshedpur in Jharkhand with the metropolitan capital city of Patna in Bihar.

This express train was inaugurated on September 15 2024, by Prime Minister Narendra Modi via video conferencing from the capital city of Ranchi instead of physically inaugurating at Tatanagar Junction in Jharkhand due to continuous rains in Jamshedpur.

== Overview ==
This train is currently operated by Indian Railways, connecting Tatanagar Jn and Patna Jn via 2 routes of services. It currently operates with 3 sets of train numbers on 6 days a week basis.

=== Routes ===
This express train runs through Netaji Subhas Chandra Bose Gomoh Jn on all 5 days except Sundays and Tuesdays, while the other express train runs through Barkakana Jn and Son Nagar Jn only on Sundays & Mondays. The route details are given below:-

Route 1 - via NSCB Gomoh Jn & BKSC Station										Route 2 - via Barkakana Jn & Son Nagar Jn				
Train No. 20893		Stations	Train No. 20894		Train No. 21895		Stations	Train No. 21896		Train No. 21893		Stations	Train No. 21894	
Wed, Thur, Fri & Sat		Stations	Wed, Thur, Fri & Sat		Only Mondays		Stations	Only Sundays		Only Sundays		Stations	Only Mondays	
Arrival	Departure	Stations	Arrival	Departure	Arrival	Departure	Stations	Arrival	Departure	Arrival	Departure	Stations	Arrival	Departure
---	05:30	Tatanagar Junction	21:30	---	---	05:30	Tatanagar Junction	23:55	---	---	05:30	Tatanagar Junction	23:55	---
06:00	06:02	Chandil Junction	20:23	20:25	06:10	06:12	Chandil Junction	22:58	23:00	06:10	06:12	Chandil Junction	22:53	22:55
07:13	07:15	Muri Junction	19:23	19:25	07:13	07:15	Muri Junction	21:58	22:00	07:13	07:15	Muri Junction	21:50	21:52
08:08	08:10	Bokaro Steel City	18:45	18:47	08:08	08:10	Bokaro Steel City	21:15	21:17	08:30	08:35	Barkakana Junction	20:50	20:55
08:53	08:55	Netaji Subhas Chandra Bose Gomoh Jn	17:58	18:00	08:50	08:55	Netaji Subhas Chandra Bose Gomoh Jn	20:22	20:27	10:42	10:44	DaltonGanj	18:03	18:05
09:05	09:07	Parasnath	17:43	17:45	09:05	09:07	Parasnath	20:05	20:07	11:50	11:52	Garhwa Road Junction	17:35	17:40
09:53	09:55	Koderma Junction	16:38	16:40	09:53	09:55	Koderma Junction	19:22	19:24	13:10	13:20	Son Nagar Junction (Reversal)	15:55	16:05
11:05	11:10	Gaya Junction (Reversal)	15:30	15:35	11:05	11:10	Gaya Junction (Reversal)	18:05	18:15	14:30	14:35	Gaya Junction	14:40	14:45
12:45	---	Patna Junction	---	14:15	12:45	---	Patna Junction	---	16:45	15:55	---	Patna Junction	---	13:20

== Rakes ==
It is the fifty-third 2nd Generation and thirty-seventh Mini Vande Bharat 2.0 Express train which was designed and manufactured by the Integral Coach Factory at Perambur, Chennai under the Make in India Initiative.

== Service ==
The Tatanagar - Patna Vande Bharat Express currently operates 6 days a week, with the following running days along with their average speeds:-

Train no.	Days of Service	Distance	Average Speed	Maximum Permissible Speed (MPS)
20893/20984	Wed, Thur, Fri, Sat	451 km (280 mi)	62 km/h (39 mph)	130 km/h (81 mph)
21893/21894	21893 - Sundays; 21894 - Mondays	642 km (399 mi)	62 km/h (39 mph)	130 km/h (81 mph)
21895/21896	21895 - Mondays; 21896 - Sundays	451 km (280 mi)	62 km/h (39 mph)	130 km/h (81 mph)

== See also ==
- Vande Bharat Express
- Tejas Express
- Gatiman Express
- Tatanagar Junction railway station
- Patna Junction railway station
