= Bokaro Steel City railway station =

Railway station in Jharkhand

BOKARO STEEL CITY

- Bokaro Steel City railway station building

General information
- Location: Balidih, Bokaro Steel City, Jharkhand; India
- Coordinates: 23°39′24″N 86°05′08″E
- Elevation: 240 metres (790 ft)
- System: Indian Railways
- Owner: Indian Railways
- Operator: South Eastern Railways
- Lines: Netaji S.C.Bose Gomoh–Hatia main line, Adra–Bokaro Steel City branch line
- Platforms: 3
- Tracks: 7

Construction
- Structure type: At grade
- Parking: Yes
- Cycle facilities: Yes
- Accessible: Available

Other information
- Status: Functional
- Station code: BKSC
- Zone(s): South Eastern Railway
- Division(s): Adra
- Website: www.irctc.co.in/nget/train-search

History
- Opened: 1961; 65 years ago
- Electrified: 1986–89
Services
Preceding station	Indian Railways	Following station
Tupkadih towards Chandrapura-Gomoh/Dhanbad	South Eastern Railway zone Gomoh–Muri branch line	Radhagaon towards Muri Junction
Terminus	South Eastern Railway zone Adra–Bokaro Steel City branch line	Ispatnagar towards Adra Junction
Route map
Location
- Location within Jharkhand Location within India
- Interactive map

Bokaro Steel City Railway Station (station code: BKSC) is a railway station on the Gomoh–Muri branch line and Adra–Bokaro Steel City branch line under Adra division of South Eastern Railways. It is located in Bokaro district in the Indian state of Jharkhand. It lies at the edge of Jharia Coalfield and serves Bokaro Steel City, and the surrounding mining-industrial area.

== History ==
The railway station and the surrounding areas were earlier called Marafari, in what was then Hazaribagh district. The surrounding areas are still referred to as Marafari. With the construction of the Bokaro Steel Plant, the railway station was renamed Bokaro Steel City.

The construction of the 143 kilometres (89 mi) long Chandrapura–Muri–Ranchi–Hatia line started in 1957 and was completed in 1961.

== Distance ==
It takes 20 minutes to travel from Bokaro Steel City Railway Station to City Centre. Approximate driving distance between Bokaro Steel City Railway Station and City Centre is 20 km. Travel time refers to the time taken if the distance is covered by a car.

== Electrification ==
Railway lines in the Bokaro area (including Bokaro Steel City Yard) were electrified in 1986–89.

== Loco shed and yard ==
Electric Loco Shed, Ispatnagar - Formerly Diesel Loco Shed, Bokaro Steel City, it used to house various locomotives such as WDM-2, WDM-3A, WDG-3A, WDS-6 loco. It mainly serves the Bokaro Steel Plant.

Serial No.	Locomotive Class	Horsepower	Quantity
1.	WAG-7	5350	111
Total Locomotives Active as of July 2025			111

Electric Loco Shed, Bokaro Steel City - New shed commissioned in 2011 with WAG-5 transferred from other sheds. Holds a few WAG-7 as well.

== Amenities ==
- Bokaro Steel City railway station has 5 double-bedded non-AC retiring rooms and a four-bedded dormitory.
- On platform 1, IRCTC has opened a new food court.
- Bokaro station has a fully air-conditioned upper class waiting hall and non-ac second class waiting hall at platform no.1.
- Vegetarian and Non-vegetarian canteen on platform no.1.
- Cloak Room in parcel office adjacent to platform no.1.
- Mobile charging points on all platforms.
- Cold water booth on all platforms.
- PCO/STD/ISD on all platforms.

== Trains ==
Mail/Express

- 13351/52 Dhanbad - Alappuzha Express
- 16619/16620 Podanur - Dhanbad Amrit Bharat Express
- 20887/88 Ranchi–Varanasi Vande Bharat Express
- 20893/94 Tatanagar–Patna Vande Bharat Express
- 20895/96 Tatanagar–Patna Vande Bharat Express
- 20839/40 Ranchi Rajdhani Express
- 22823/24 Bhubaneswar Rajdhani Express
- 12019/20 Howrah–Ranchi Shatabdi Express
- 18403/04 Bhubaneswar - Dhanbad Express
- 12365/66 Ranchi–Patna Jan Shatabdi Express
- 12801/02 Puri–New Delhi Purushottam Express
- 12875/76 Puri–Delhi Anand Vihar Neelachal Express
- 22805/06 Bhubneshwar–New Delhi Superfast Express
- ritsar Jallianwalabagh Express
- 12817/18 Hatia–Delhi Anand Vihar Terminal Jharkhand Swarna Jayanti Express
- 12825/26 Ranchi–New Delhi Jharkhand Sampark Kranti Express
- 12365/66 Patna–Ranchi Jan Shatabdi Express
- 17005/06 Raxaul–Hyderabad Express
- 17007/08 Darbhanga–Secunderabad Express
- 18609/10 Ranchi–Mumbai LTT Express
- 18621/22 Hatia–Patna Patliputra Express
- 18623/24 Hatia–Patna–Islampur Express
- 18625/26 Hatia–Patna–Purnia Court Express
- 18627/28 Ranchi–Howrah Intercity Express
- 15027/28 Hatia–Gorakhpur Maurya Express
- 03357/58 Dhanbad - Coimbatore Special
- 18618/19 Ranchi–Godda Intercity Express
- 15660/61 Kamakhya–Ranchi Express
- 13425/26 Surat–Malda Town Express
- 17321/22 Jasidih-Vasco-da-Gama Express
- 13303/04 Dhanbad–Ranchi Intercity Express
- 13403/04 Ranchi–Bhagalpur Vananchal Express
- 18603/04 Ranchi–Bhagalpur Express
- 18605/06 Ranchi–Jaynagar Express
- 18013/14 Bokaro-Howrah Express
- 13319/20 Dumka–Ranchi Intercity Express
- 18019/20 Jhargram - Dhanbad Memu Express
- 13503/04 Barddhaman-Hatia Memu Express

Passenger train

- 63591/92 Bokaro Steel City–Asansol MEMU
- 58033/34 Bokaro Steel City–Ranchi Passenger
- 63519/20 Bokaro Steel City-Barddhaman MEMU

== Nearest airports ==
- Bokaro Airport
