= Patna–Ranchi AC Express =

Indian Railways express train

Overview
- Service type: AC Express
- First service: 8 December 2018 (as Special Train); 17 February 2019 (Conversion into Express Train)
- Current operator(s): South Eastern Railways

Route
- Termini: Patna Junction; Ranchi Junction
- Stops: 10
- Distance travelled: 424 km (263 mi)
- Average journey time: 10 hours 23 mins
- Service frequency: Weekly
- Train number(s): 18633 / 18634

On-board services
- Class(es): AC 1 Tier, AC 2 Tier, AC 3 Tier
- Sleeping arrangements: Yes
- Catering facilities: Pantry car attached

Technical
- Rolling stock: LHB coach
- Track gauge: 1,676 mm (5 ft 6 in)
- Operating speed: 140 km/h (87 mph) maximum, 41 km/h (25 mph), including halts

Patna–Ranchi AC Express is a fully air conditioned express train belonging to South Eastern Railway zone of Indian Railways that run between Patna Junction and Ranchi Junction in India.

== Background ==
This line was inaugurated on 8 December 2018 as a seasonal line running Ranchi–Patna AC special train (No. 08623/24).

On 17 February 2019, this Special train was converted into Express train with new numbered 18633 / 34 and became the first weekly train running between the Patna and Ranchi corridor.

== Service ==
The frequency of this train is weekly. It covers the distance of 424 km with an average speed of 41 km/h.

== Routes ==
This train passes through Gaya Junction, Koderma Junction and Muri Junction on both sides.

== Traction ==
As this route is electrified, a WAG-7 based loco pulls the train to its destination on both sides.
