= Koderma Junction railway station =

Railway station in Jharkhand

KODERMA JUNCTION

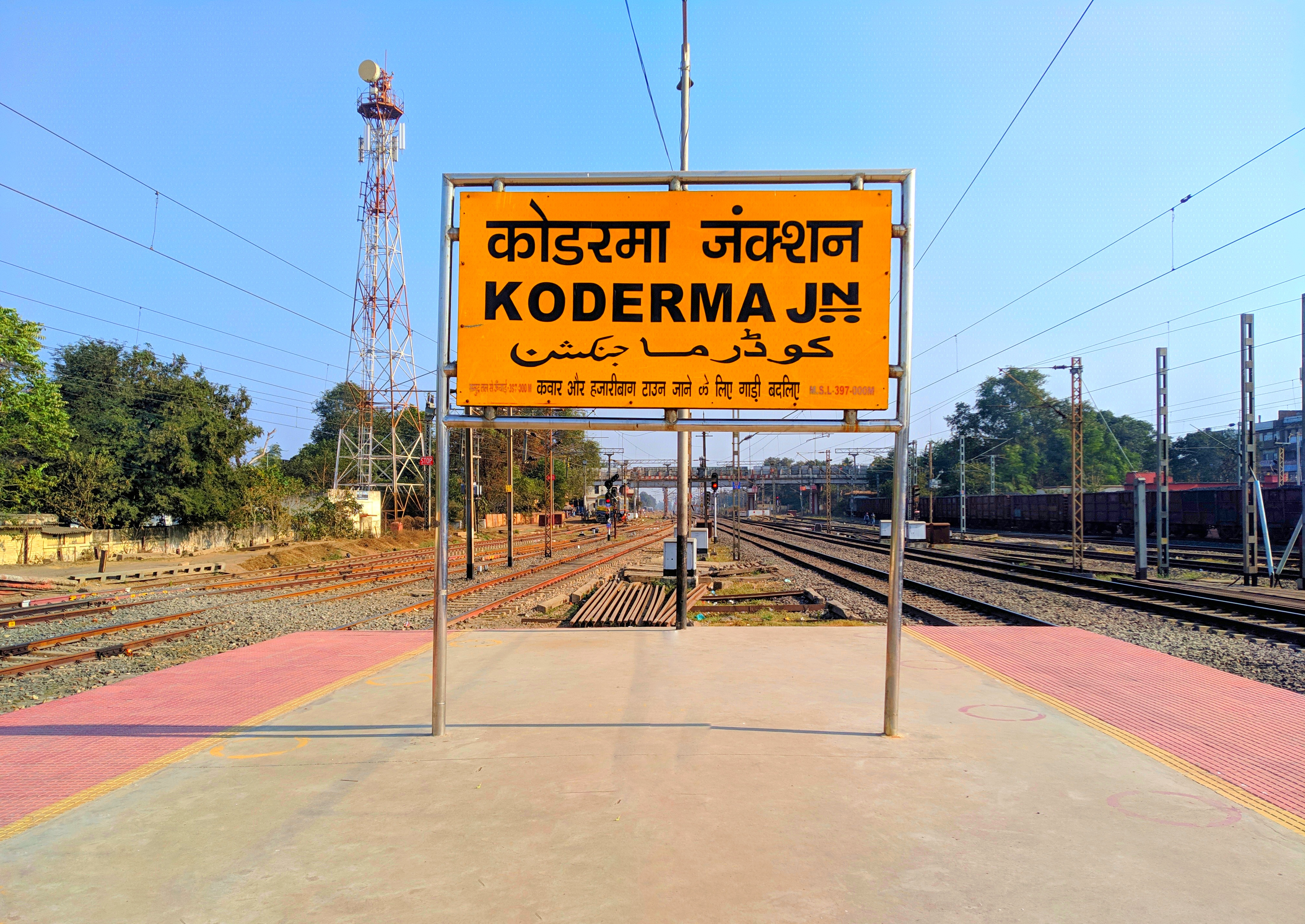
- Koderma Railway station platform

General information
- Location: Station Road, Jhumri Telaiya, Koderma, Jharkhand- 825409; India
- Coordinates: 24°26′6″N 85°31′40″E
- Elevation: 398 metres (1,306 ft)
- System: Indian Railways station
- Owner: Indian Railways
- Operator: East Central Railway
- Lines: Asansol–Gaya section, New Delhi–Gaya–Howrah line, Howrah–Prayagraj–Mumbai line, Koderma–Hazaribagh–Barkakana–Ranchi line, Madhupur–Giridih–Koderma line; Koderma–Tilaiya line (under construction)
- Platforms: 7
- Tracks: 8

Construction
- Parking: Available
- Cycle facilities: Not available

Other information
- Status: Functional
- Station code: KQR
- Zone(s): East Central Railway
- Division(s): Dhanbad

History
- Opened: 1906; 120 years ago
- Rebuilt: Currently new Hi-tech building is under construction & redevelopment of station is going on.
Location
- Location within India Location within Jharkhand Location within India
- Interactive map of Koderma Junction

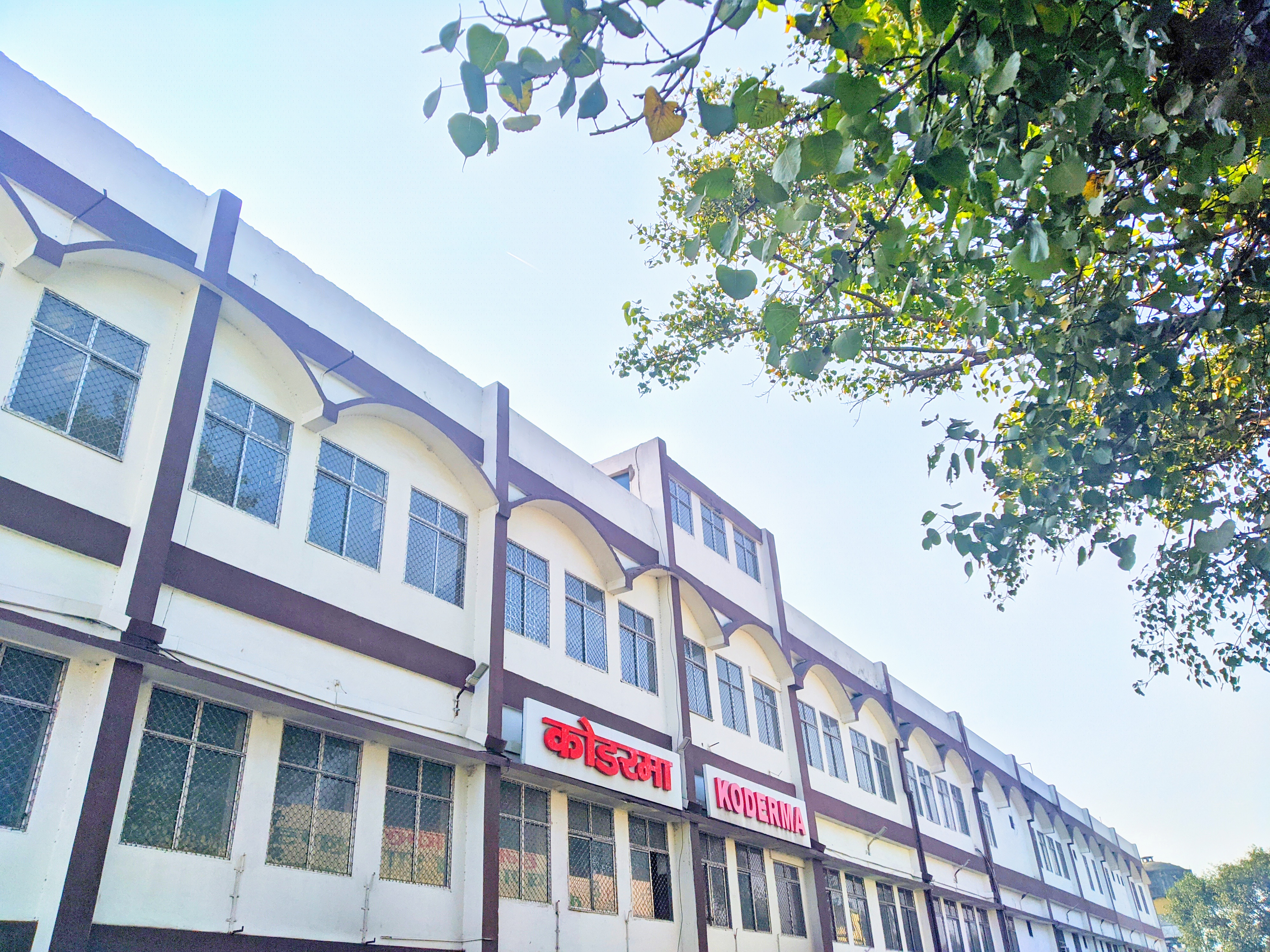
Koderma junction

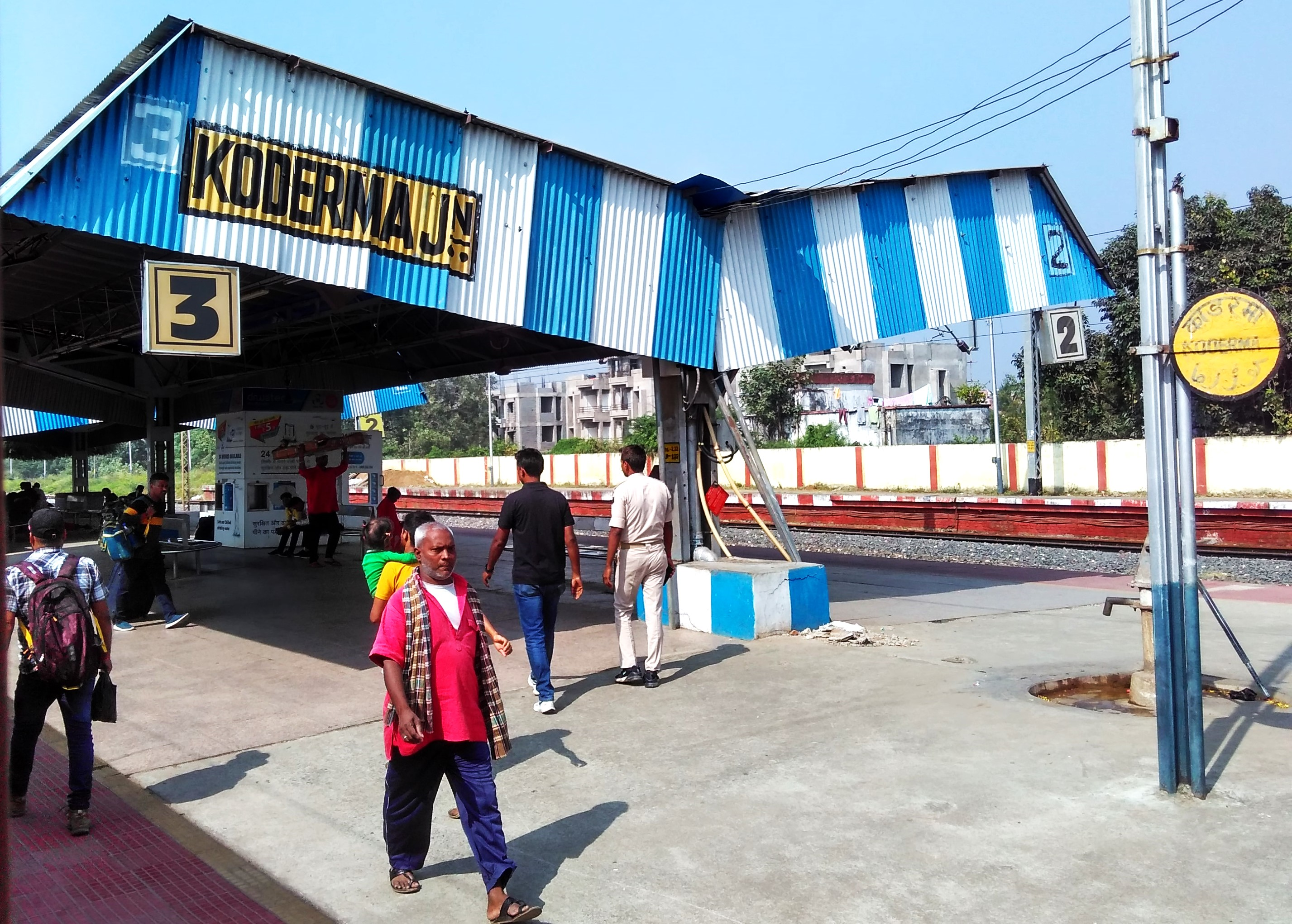
Koderma Junction railway station platform

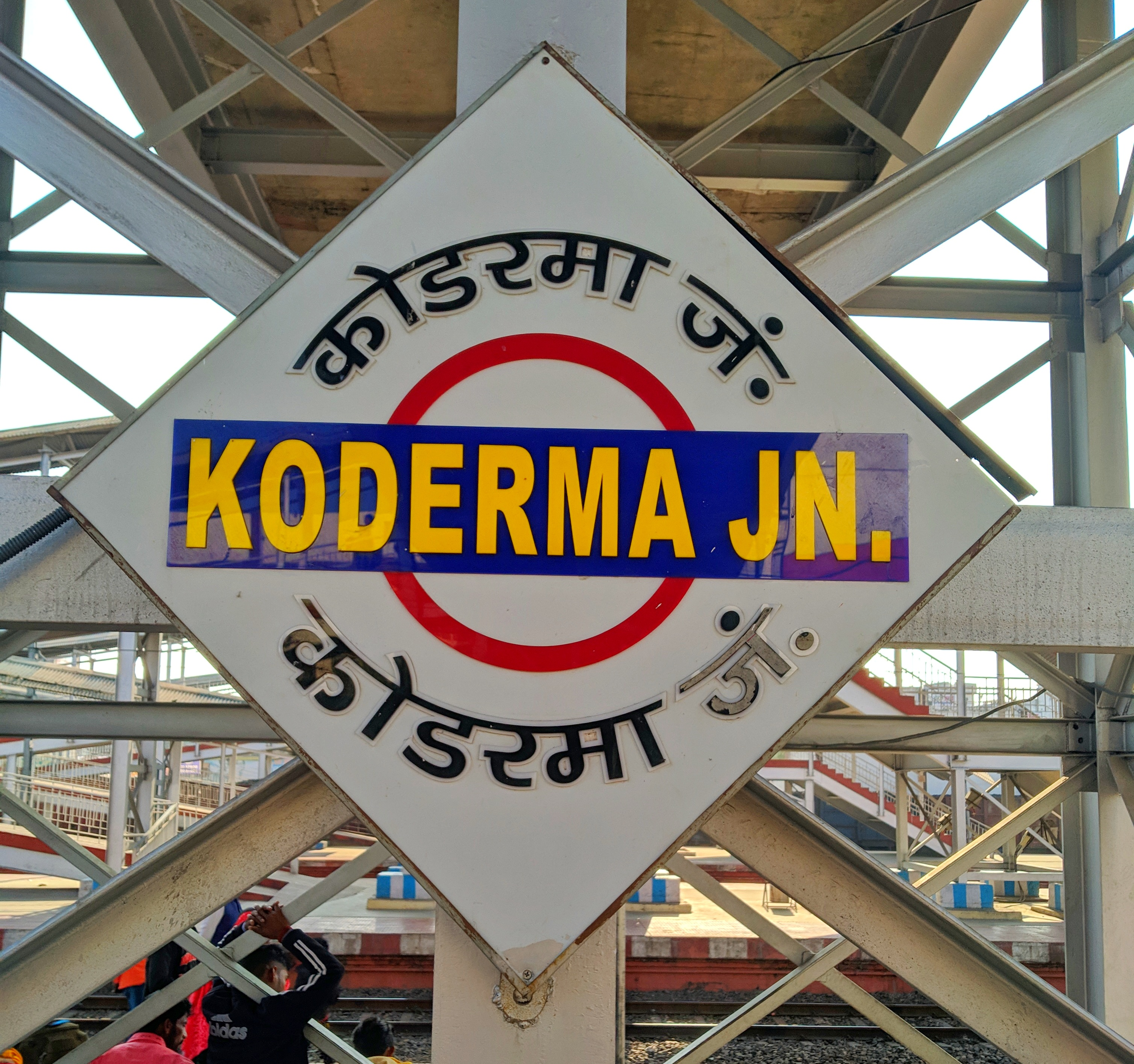

Koderma Junction railway station, station code KQR, is railway station of the Indian railway under Dhanbad railway division of East Central Railway zone serving the city of Jhumri Telaiya near by Koderma city, the headquarters of Koderma district in the Indian state of Jharkhand. Grand Chord rail-line that connects Howrah and New Delhi passes through Koderma Junction. In this station, 4 Vande Bharat Express, 2 Rajdhani Express & 1 Duronto Express halts here.

== Geography ==
Koderma is located at 24°26′7″N 86°31′39″E. It is in the Dhanbad railway division of the East Central Railway zone. Grand Chord rail-line that connects Howrah and New Delhi passes through Koderma Junction. Other 3 lines have been connected with Koderma making it a junction namely 1)Koderma–Hazaribagh–Barkakana–Ranchi line, 2)Koderma–Giridih–Madhupur line and 3)Koderma–Tilaiya line(Under construction) by which koderma junction is directly connected with Nawada, Rajgir & biharsarif and also the new route to go patna. It has an elevation of 398 metres (1,306 ft). Koderma has a rail connectivity with the other major parts of the country such as Delhi, Mumbai, Kolkata, Lucknow, Patna, Ranchi, Jamshedpur, Varanasi, Bhubaneshwar, Ahmedabad, Indore, Gwalior, Jabalpur, Jaipur, Nagpur, Ajmer, Secunderabad, Amritsar etc.

== History ==
The Grand Chord was opened in 1906.

== Electrification ==
The Gomoh–Koderma sector was electrified in 1961–62.

== Facilities ==
The station houses all the major facilities like Waiting rooms, Computerized reservation facility, ATVM machine, Food plaza, Foot Overbridge, Separate Car and bike parking etc. Currently new Hi-tech building (with various facilities) is under construction.

== Trains ==
Koderma station's location on the Grand Chord makes it served by several superfast, express and passenger trains from all over the country. Following are some of the premium train services:

- Bhubaneswar Tejas Rajdhani Express
- Ranchi Rajdhani Express
- Sealdah–Bikaner Duronto Express
- Patna - Ranchi Vande Bharat Express
- Ranchi–Varanasi Vande Bharat Express
- Tatanagar–Patna Vande Bharat Express
- Howrah–Gaya Vande Bharat Express
- Howrah–Anand Vihar Terminal Amrit Bharat Express
- Patna - Ranchi Jan Shatabdi Express
- Jharkhand Sampark Kranti Express
- Howrah–Gwalior Chambal Express
- Howrah–Mathura Chambal Express
- Bhubaneswar–Anand Vihar Weekly Superfast Express
- Ranchi–Lokmanya Tilak Terminus Weekly Express
- Tatanagar–Amritsar Jallianwalla Bagh Express
- Sealdah–Jallianwalla Bagh Express
- Howrah–Barmer Express
- Shalimar–Gorakhpur Express
- Garba Superfast Express
- Pratap Express

== Originating trains ==
- [ 53370 ] Koderma – Madhupur Passenger
- [ 53366 ] Koderma – Maheshmunda Passenger
- [ 53371 ] Koderma– Barkakana Passenger
- [ 53373 ] Koderma –Barkakana Passenger
- [ 13233 ] Koderma - Danapur Intercity Express
- [ 63384 ] Koderma – Vaishali Fast MEMU

== Terminating trains ==
- [ 53369 ] Madhupur – Koderma Passenger
- [ 53365 ] Maheshmunda – Koderma Passenger
- [ 53372 ] Barkakana– Koderma Passenger
- [ 53374 ] Barkakana –Koderma Passenger
- [ 13234 ] Danapur - Koderma Intercity Express
- [ 63383 ] Vaishali - Koderma Fast MEMU

== Nearest airports ==
The nearest airports to Koderma station are:

1. Gaya Airport - 106 kilometres (66 mi)
2. Giridih Airport - 104 kilometres (65 mi)
3. Deoghar Airport - 155 kilometres (96 mi)
4. Bokaro Airport - 155 kilometres (96 mi)
5. Birsa Munda Airport, Ranchi - 158 kilometres (98 mi)
6. Lok Nayak Jayaprakash Airport, Patna - 179 kilometres (111 mi)
