= Suisa railway station =

Railway station in West Bengal, India

General information
- Location: State Highway 4, Suisa, Purulia district, West Bengal; India
- Coordinates: 23.196775°N 85.909013°E
- Elevation: 220 metres (720 ft)
- System: Indian Railways station
- Line: Single electric line
- Platforms: 2
- Tracks: Single Electric-Line

Other information
- Status: Functional
- Station code: SSIA
- Zone(s): South Eastern Railway
- Division(s): Ranchi

History
- Opened: 1927

Services
Preceding station	Indian Railways	Following station
Tiruldih towards ?	South Eastern Railway zone Barkakana–Muri–Chandil line	Torang towards ?
Location

Suisa railway station is an Indian railway station of Barkakana–Muri branch line, located under Ranchi railway division of the South Eastern Railway zone of the Indian Railways. It is situated beside State Highway 4 at Suisa in Purulia district in the Indian state of West Bengal.

== History ==
The Chandil–Barkakana line was opened in 1927 by Bengal Nagpur Railways and this section is known as Coal India Chord Section (CIC section). This railway sector was electrified in 2001.
