= Haslang railway station =

Railway station in Jharkhand

General information
- Location: Dulmi Road, Haslang, Seraikela Kharsawan district, Jharkhand; India
- Coordinates: 23.091614°N 86.011923°E
- Elevation: 201 metres (659 ft)
- System: Indian Railways station
- Line: Single electric line
- Platforms: 1
- Tracks: Single Electric-Line

Other information
- Status: Functional
- Station code: HNSL
- Zone(s): South Eastern Railway
- Division(s): Ranchi

History
- Opened: 1927

Services
Preceding station	Indian Railways	Following station
Jhimri towards ?	South Eastern Railway zone Barkakana–Muri–Chandil line	Latemda towards ?
Location

Haslang railway station is an Indian halt railway station of Barkakana–Muri branch line, located under Ranchi railway division of the South Eastern Railway zone of the Indian Railways. It is situated beside Dulmi Road, at Haslang in Seraikela Kharsawan district in the Indian state of Jharkhand.

== History ==
The Chandil–Barkakana line was opened in 1927 by Bengal Nagpur Railways and this section is known as Coal India Chord Section (CIC section). This railway sector was electrified in 2001.
