= Ranchi–Varanasi Vande Bharat Express =

Mini Vande Bharat Express train route in India

Ranchi Junction - Varanasi Junction Vande Bharat Express
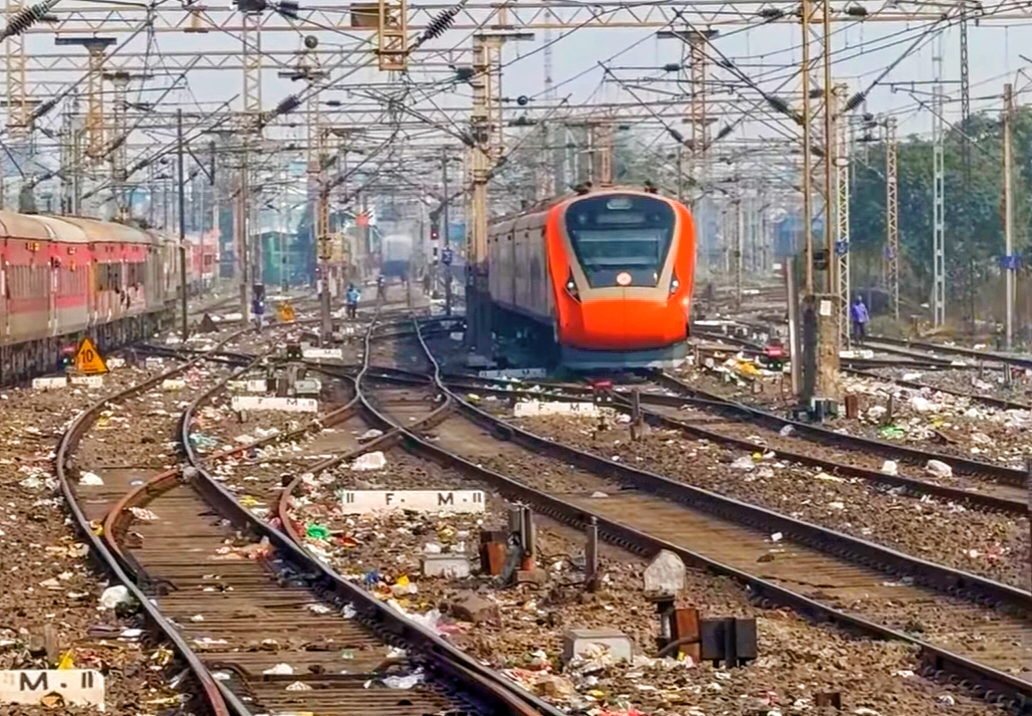
- Ranchi Junction - Varanasi JunctionVande Bharat Express At Pt DDU junction

Overview
- Service type: Vande Bharat Express
- Locale: Jharkhand, Bihar and Uttar Pradesh
- First service: 12 March 2024; 2 years ago (Inaugural)
- Current operator: South Eastern Railways (SER)

Route
- Termini: Ranchi Junction (RNC); Varanasi Junction (BSB)
- Stops: 08
- Distance travelled: 538 km (334 mi)
- Average journey time: 07 hrs 50 mins
- Service frequency: Six days a week (Note: Except Tuesdays)
- Train number: 20887 / 20888
- Lines used: Ranchi–Netaji S.C.Bose Gomoh line; Howrah–Gaya–Delhi line (till DDU); DDU–Varanasi line

On-board services
- Classes: AC Chair Car, AC Executive Chair Car
- Seating arrangements: Airline style; Rotatable seats
- Sleeping arrangements: No
- Catering facilities: On board Catering
- Observation facilities: Large windows in all coaches
- Entertainment facilities: On-board WiFi; Infotainment System; Electric outlets; Reading light; Seat Pockets; Bottle Holder; Tray Table
- Baggage facilities: Overhead racks
- Other facilities: Kavach

Technical
- Rolling stock: Mini Vande Bharat 2.0
- Track gauge: Indian gauge 1,676 mm (5 ft 6 in) broad gauge
- Electrification: 25 kV 50 Hz AC Overhead line
- Operating speed: 69 km/h (43 mph) (Avg.)
- Average length: 192 metres (630 ft) (08 coaches)
- Track owner: Indian Railways
- Rake maintenance: (TBC)

The 20887/20888 Ranchi - Varanasi Vande Bharat Express is India's 49th Vande Bharat Express train, which connects the capital city of Jharkhand, Ranchi with the pilgrimage spot of the Holy Ganges River, Varanasi in northern Uttar Pradesh. This express train was inaugurated by Prime Minister Narendra Modi via video conferencing from Ahmedabad on March 12 2024.

== Overview ==
This train is operated by Indian Railways, connecting Ranchi Jn, Muri Jn, Bokaro Steel City, Parasnath, Hazaribagh Road, Koderma Jn, Gaya Jn, Sasaram Jn, Pandit Deen Dayal Upadhyaya Jn and Varanasi Jn. It is operated with train numbers 20887/20888 on 6 days a week basis.

== Rakes ==
It is the forty-seventh 2nd Generation and thirty-second Mini Vande Bharat 2.0 Express train which was designed and manufactured by the Integral Coach Factory at Perambur, Chennai under the Make in India Initiative.

== Service ==
The 20887/20888 Ranchi Jn - Varanasi Jn Vande Bharat Express operates six days a week except Tuesdays, covering a distance of 538 km (334 mi) in a travel time of 7 hours 50 mins with an average speed of 69 km/h (43 mph). The Maximum Permissible Speed is 130 km/h (81 mph).

== See also ==
- Vande Bharat Express
- Tejas Express
- Gatimaan Express
- Ranchi Junction railway station
- Varanasi Junction railway station
