= Nimiaghat railway station =

Railway station in Jharkhand

NIMIAGHAT

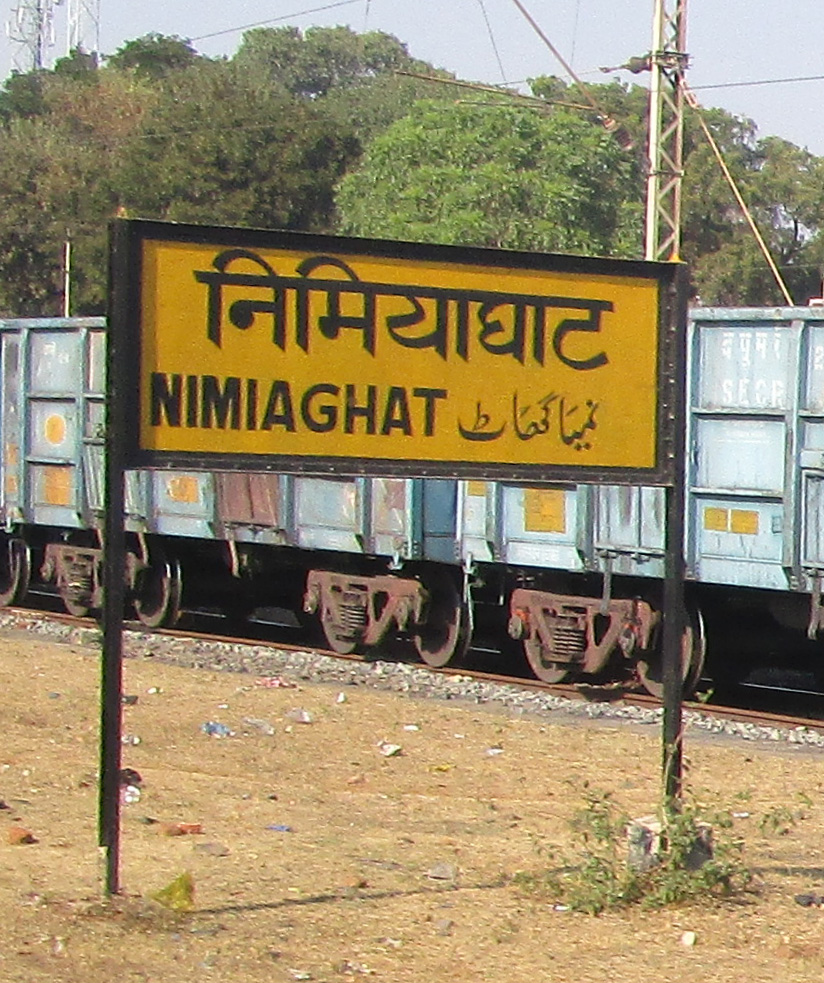
- Nimiaghat railway station nameplate

General information
- Location: Nimiaghat, Giridih district, Jharkhand; India
- Coordinates: 23°55′56″N 86°04′35″E
- Elevation: 268 metres (879 ft)
- System: Indian Railways station
- Owner: Indian Railways
- Operator: East Central Railway
- Line: Asansol–Gaya section
- Platforms: 2

Construction
- Structure type: Standard (on ground station)
- Parking: Yes
- Cycle facilities: No

Other information
- Status: Functioning
- Station code: NMG
- Division(s): Dhanbad

History
- Opened: 1906
- Electrified: 1986–89

Services
Preceding station	Indian Railways	Following station
Netaji Subhas Chandra Bose Gomoh towards ?	East Central Railway zone Asansol–Gaya section	Parasnath towards ?
Location
- Location within Jharkhand Location within India

Nimiaghat railway station is a railway station on the Asansol–Gaya section of Grand Chord. It is located in Giridih district in the Indian state of Jharkhand. It is located at the base of Shikharji (Parasnath Hill) and is on one of the routes for climbing the hill. Nimiaghat station is also having DVC power transmission station.

== History ==
The Grand Chord was opened in 1906.

== Electrification ==
The Gomoh–Koderma sector was electrified in 1961–62.
