= Mael railway station =

Railway station in Jharkhand

General information
- Location: Mael Station Road, Chhotki Lari, Ramgarh district, Jharkhand; India
- Coordinates: 23.5746°N 85.6260°E
- Elevation: 363 metres (1,191 ft)
- System: Indian Railways station
- Line: Single electric line
- Platforms: 1
- Tracks: 2

Construction
- Parking: Not available

Other information
- Status: Functional
- Station code: MAEL
- Zone(s): South Eastern Railway
- Division(s): Ranchi

Services
Preceding station	Indian Railways	Following station
Barkipona towards ?	South Eastern Railway zone Barkakana–Muri–Chandil line	Ramgarh Cantt towards ?
Location

Mael railway station is an Indian railway station of Barkakana–Muri branch line, located under Ranchi railway division of the South Eastern Railway zone of the Indian Railways. It is situated beside Mael Station Road at Chhotki Lariat in Ramgarh district in the Indian state of Jharkhand.

== History ==
The Chandil–Barkakana line was opened in 1927 by Bengal Nagpur Railways and this section is known as Coal India Chord Section (CIC section). This railway sector was electrified in 2001.
