= Radhagaon railway station =

Railway station in Bokaro district, Jharkhand, India

Radhagaon Railway Station

General information
- Location: Radhanagar, Bokaro, Jharkhand; India
- Coordinates: 23.5975°N 86.0888°E
- Elevation: 247 metres (810 ft)
- System: Indian Railways station
- Owner: Indian Railways
- Operator: South Eastern Railway
- Line: Gomoh–Muri branch line
- Platforms: 2
- Tracks: 4 (Double Electrified BG)
- Connections: Auto stand

Construction
- Structure type: Standard (on ground station)
- Parking: No
- Cycle facilities: No

Other information
- Status: Functioning
- Station code: RDF
- Zone(s): South Eastern Railway
- Division(s): Adra
Location

Radhagaon Railway Station is a small railway station in Bokaro district, Jharkhand. Its code is RDF. It serves Radhagaon area of Bokaro Steel City Industrial area. The station consists of three platforms. The platforms are not well sheltered. It lacks many facilities including water and sanitation.

== Major trains ==
Some of the important trains that runs from Radhagaon are :

- Bokaro Steel City–Asansol MEMU
- Muri–Dhanbad Passenger (unreserved)
- Dhanbad–Ranchi Passenger (unreserved)
- Jhargram–Dhanbad MEMU
- Hatia–Barddhaman Passenger (unreserved)
- Asansol–Bokaro Steel City MEMU

== See also ==
- Bokaro Steel City railway station
- Bokaro Thermal railway station
