= Ranchi–Lokmanya Tilak Terminus Weekly Express =

Superfast express train

Ranchi–Mumbai Lokmanya Tilak Terminus Express
Overview
- Service type: Superfast
- First service: 22 October 2002; 23 years ago
- Current operator: South Eastern Railway zone

Route
- Termini: Ranchi; Lokmanya Tilak Terminus
- Stops: 24
- Distance travelled: 2,020 km (1,255 mi)
- Average journey time: 30 hours
- Service frequency: Bi-Weekly
- Train number: 18609 / 18610

On-board services
- Classes: AC 2 tier, AC 3 tier, sleeper class, general unreserved
- Seating arrangements: Yes
- Sleeping arrangements: Yes
- Catering facilities: No

Technical
- Rolling stock: Standard Indian Railways coaches
- Track gauge: 1,676 mm (5 ft 6 in)
- Operating speed: 51.5 km/h (32 mph)

The 18609 / 10 Ranchi–Lokmanya Tilak Terminus Express is a Superfast express train belonging to Indian Railways South Eastern Zone that runs between Ranchi and Lokmanya Tilak Terminus in India.

It operates as train number 18609 from Ranchi to Lokmanya Tilak Terminus and as train number 18610 in the reverse direction, serving the states of Jharkhand, Bihar, Uttar Pradesh, Madhya Pradesh & Maharashtra.

== Coaches ==
The 18609 / 10 Ranchi–Lokmanya Tilak Terminus Express has one AC 2-tier, three AC 3-tier, 13 sleeper class, four general unreserved and two SLR (seating with luggage rake) coaches. It does not carry a pantry car.

As is customary with most train services in India, coach composition may be amended at the discretion of Indian Railways depending on demand.

== Service ==
The 22869 Ranchi–Lokmanya Tilak Terminus Express covers the distance of 2,020 km (1,255 mi) in 39 hours 00 mins (52 km/h) and in 39 hours 35 mins as the 18610 Lokmanya Tilak Terminus–Ranchi Express (51 km/h).

As the average speed of the train is lower than 55 km/h (34 mph), as per railway rules, its fare doesn't includes a Superfast surcharge.

== Routing ==
The 18609 / 10 Ranchi–Lokmanya Tilak Terminus Express runs from Ranchi via Muri Junction, Gomoh Junction, Koderma Junction, Gaya Junction, Varanasi Junction, Allahabad Junction, Jabalpur Junction, Itarsi Junction, Bhusaval Junction, Kalyan Junction to Lokmanya Tilak Terminus.

== Traction ==
It is now hauled by WAP-7 of Electric Loco Shed, Ajni or Electric Loco Shed, Tatanagar from Ranchi Junction to Lokmanya Tilak Terminus towards entire journey.
