= Bhubaneswar Rajdhani Express =

Train in India

Bhubaneswar - New Delhi Tejas Rajdhani Express

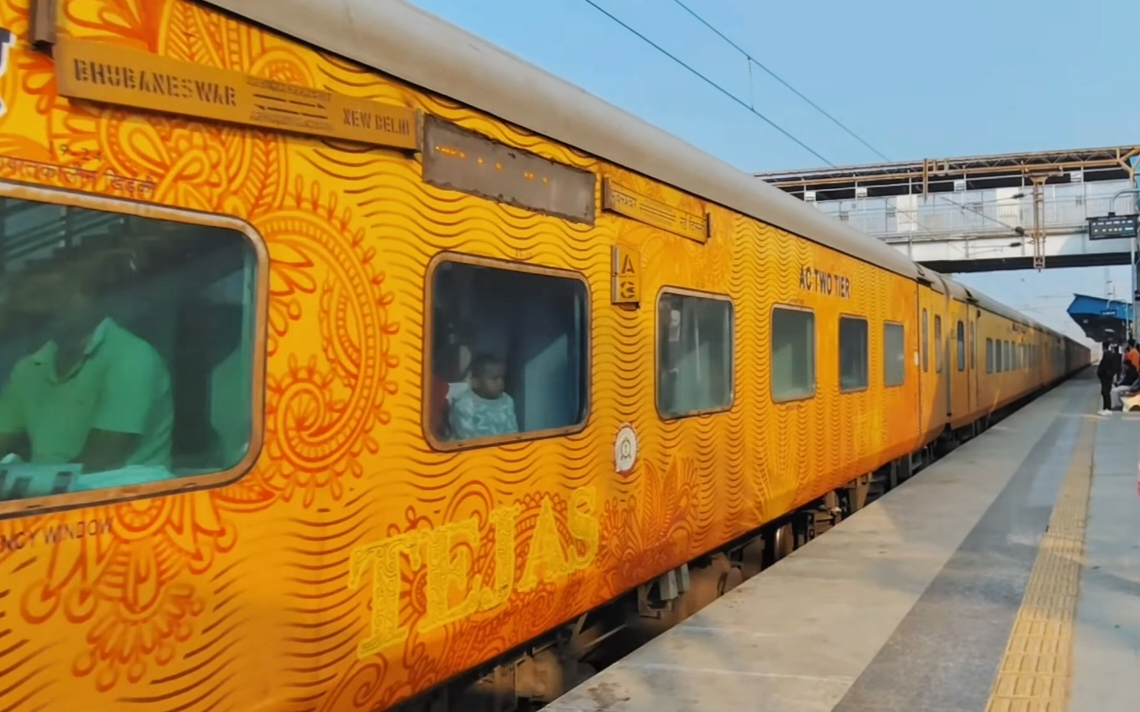
- Bhubaneswar Tejas Rajdhani Express Arrived At NCB Gomoh Junction

Overview
- Service type: Tejas Rajdhani Express
- Locale: Odisha, West Bengal, Jharkhand, Bihar, Uttar Pradesh & Delhi
- First service: April 1, 1994; 32 years ago
- Current operator: East Coast Railway

Route
- Termini: Bhubaneswar (BBS); New Delhi (NDLS)
- Stops: 14 (20817/20818); 13 (22811/22812); 13 (22823/22824)
- Distance travelled: 20817/20818 - 1,914 km (1,189 mi) 22811/22812 - 1,730 km (1,075 mi) 22823/22824 - 1,801 km (1,119 mi)
- Average journey time: 20817/20818 (27 Hours 10 Mins) 22811/22812 (23 Hours 20 Mins) 22823/22824 (24 Hours 30 Mins)
- Service frequency: 20817/20818 (Weekly); 22811/22812 (Bi-weekly); 22823/22824 (4 days a week)
- Train numbers: 20817/20818; 22811/22812; 22823/22824

On-board services
- Classes: AC First Class, AC 2 Tier, AC 3 Tier
- Seating arrangements: No
- Sleeping arrangements: Yes
- Catering facilities: Available
- Observation facilities: Large windows
- Baggage facilities: Available
- Other facilities: Below the seats

Technical
- Rolling stock: Tejas coach
- Track gauge: 1,676 mm (5 ft 6 in)
- Operating speed: Average Speed (incl. stops); 20817/20818 (70 km/h); 22811/22812 (74 km/h); 22823/22824 (73 km/h)

The Bhubaneswar–New Delhi Tejas Rajdhani Express is a Tejas Rajdhani Express train starting from Bhubaneswar, the capital and largest city of the Indian state of Odisha to the final destination of New Delhi, the capital of India. Currently, there are three dedicated sets of rakes operating from Bhubaneswar to New Delhi. This is the 3rd Rajdhani train which is having 3 dedicated routes after Dibrugarh Rajdhani Express and Ranchi Rajdhani Express.

== History ==
- 1st set of Bhubaneswar Rajdhani Express was introduced on 1994–95 Rail Budget by C. K. Jaffer Sharief (Former Minister of Railways) as a weekly frequency train. Later the service was increased to bi-weekly after public demand in 1998. It used to get WAP-4 locomotive from Ghaziabad shed (NDLS–HWH) & Santragachi shed (HWH–BBS) and also changed its route to Adra Instead of bypassing Howrah in 2002.
- 2nd set of Bhubaneswar Rajdhani Express was introduced on 2003 by Nitish Kumar (Former Minister of Railways) as a bi-weekly frequency train. Later in 2004 the frequency of this train are increased to 4 days in a week.
- Later, 3rd set of Bhubaneswar Rajdhani Express was inaugurated on 10 February 2018, was flagged off by Piyush Goyal (Minister of Railways) as a weekly frequency train which bypasses through Sambalpur.

== Overview ==
This train is fully air conditioned and has an AC Hot Buffet car to provide both vegetarian and non-vegetarian meals during the journey. The meals are pre-paid along with the ticket, similar to the other Rajdhani Express trains. The train offers three classes of accommodation i.e. AC First Class (1A) with 2-berth and 4-berth couples (with locking facility for privacy), AC Two Tier (2A) with open bays (4 berths/bay + 2 berths on the other side of the aisle of each bay), provided with curtains for privacy, and AC Three Tier (3A) with open bays (6 berths/bay + 2 berths on the other side of the aisle of each bay) without curtains.

Bhubaneswar Rajdhani's coaches was painted in Pattachitra and NALCO branding in December 2019. However, it was upgraded to Tejas rake on 14 August 2023, making it the latest and 5th Tejas Rajdhani Express of India.

== Traction ==
The 3 sets of Bhubaneswar Tejas Rajdhani Express are hauled by a Visakhapatnam Loco Shed-based WAP-7 electric locomotive on its entire journey (earlier with standard LHB Red coach was WAP-4).

== Coach composition ==
Train Number	1	2	3	4	5	6	7	8	9	10	11	12	13	14	15	16	17	18	19
20817 / 22811 / 22823	LOCO	EOG	B1	B2	B3	B4	B5	B6	B7	B8	B9	B10	B11	PC	H1	A1	A2	A3	EOG
20818 / 22812 / 22824	LOCO	EOG	A3	A2	A1	H1	PC	B11	B10	B9	B8	B7	B6	B5	B4	B3	B2	B1	EOG

== Routes ==
Route 1 - via Sambalpur City					Route 2 - via Adra					Route 3 - via Tatanagar				
Train No. 20817		Stations	Train No. 20818		Train No. 22811		Stations	Train No. 22812		Train No. 22823		Stations	Train No. 22824	
Arrival	Departure	Stations	Arrival	Departure	Arrival	Departure	Stations	Arrival	Departure	Arrival	Departure	Stations	Arrival	Departure
---	07:15	Bhubaneswar	20:10	---	---	10:35	Bhubaneswar	16:15	---	---	09:30	Bhubaneswar	17:30	---
07:40	07:42	Cuttack	19:08	19:10	11:01	11:03	Cuttack	15:17	15:19	09:54	09:56	Cuttack	16:41	16:43
08:32	08:34	Dhenkanal	17:45	17:47	11:52	11:54	Jajpur Keonjhar Road	14:21	14:23	11:35	11:37	Bhadrak	15:13	15:15
09:25	09:27	Angul	16:45	16:47	11:52	11:54	Jajpur Keonjhar Road	14:21	14:23	12:20	12:22	Balasore	14:16	14:18
11:23	11:25	Sambalpur City	14:55	14:57	12:45	12:47	Bhadrak	13:48	13:50	13:45	13:55	Hijli	12:45	12:55
12:38	12:40	Jharsuguda	14:08	14:10	13:30	13:32	Balasore	12:48	12:50	15:52	15:57	Tatanagar	10:40	10:45
14:00	14:08	Rourkela	12:05	12:10	14:55	15:03	Hijli	11:15	11:25	17:55	17:57	Muri	08:23	08:25
15:30	15:32	Chakradharpur	10:38	10:40	17:10	17:12	Bankura	09:06	09:08	18:55	19:00	Bokaro Steel City	07:30	07:35
17:58	18:00	Anara	08:18	08:20	18:00	18:05	Adra	08:20	08:25	18:55	19:00	Bokaro Steel City	07:30	07:35
20:00	20:05	Gomoh	06:55	07:00	20:00	20:05	Gomoh	06:55	07:00	20:00	20:05	Gomoh	06:25	06:30
20:56	20:58	Koderma	05:18	05:20	20:56	20:58	Koderma	05:18	05:20	20:56	20:58	Koderma	05:18	05:20
22:19	22:22	Gaya	04:10	04:13	22:19	22:22	Gaya	04:10	04:13	22:19	22:22	Gaya	04:10	04:13
00:35	00:45	Mughalsarai	01:52	02:02	00:35	00:45	Mughalsarai	01:52	02:02	00:35	00:45	Mughalsarai	01:52	02:02
02:33	02:35	Prayagraj	23:53	23:55	02:33	02:35	Prayagraj	23:53	23:55	02:33	02:35	Prayagraj	23:53	23:55
04:40	04:45	Kanpur Central	21:42	21:47	04:40	04:45	Kanpur Central	21:42	21:47	04:40	04:45	Kanpur Central	21:42	21:47
09:55	---	New Delhi	---	17:00	09:55	---	New Delhi	---	17:00	09:55	---	New Delhi	---	17:00

== Incidents ==
- On 27 October 2009, Bhubaneswar Rajdhani was hijacked by Maoists and later train was taken over by Security Forces no damage to life happened.
- On 3 Apr 2019, two coaches of Bhubaneswar Rajdhani uncoupled on the river bridge which is 2.5 km away from Cuttack immediately the loco pilot stopped the train, no casualties reported.
- On 11 May 2019, a fire broke out at Generator Car of Bhubaneswar Rajdhani nearby Balasore, immediately railway staffs kept fire in under control, no casualties reported.

== Gallery ==
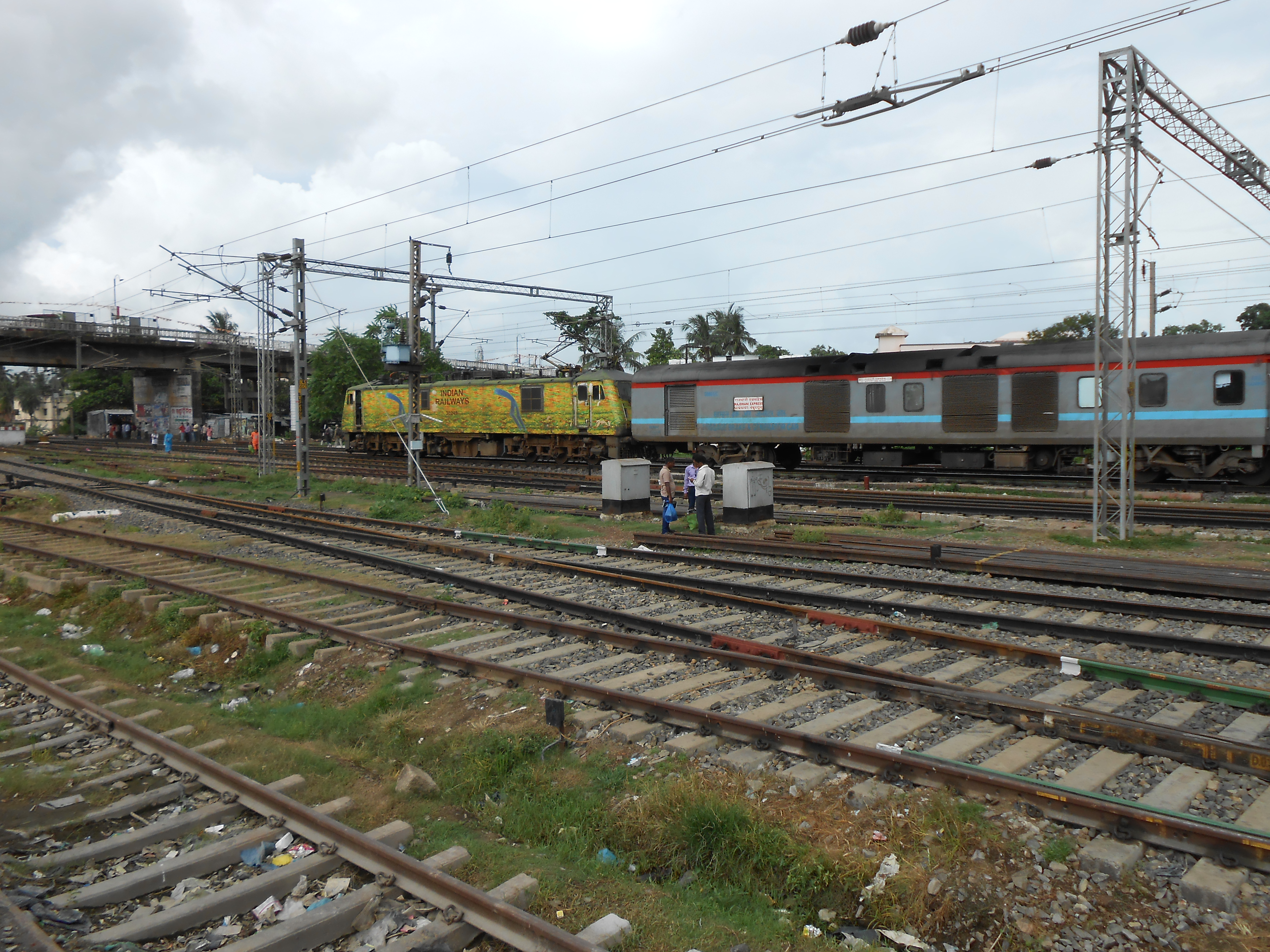
Bhubaneswar Rajdhani via Baleshwar being hauled by a Duronto-liveried WAP-7 of Ghaziabad Loco Shed.

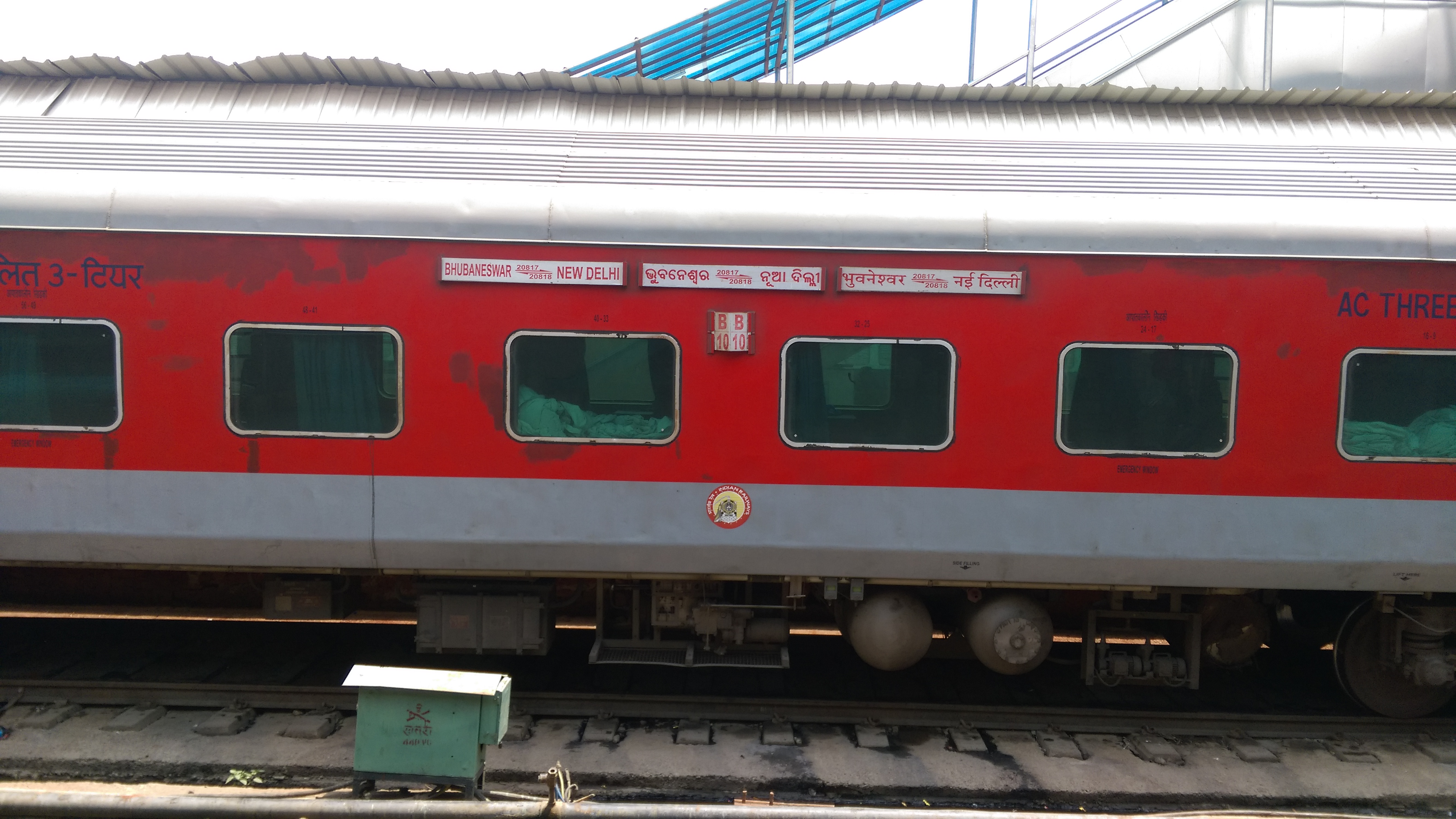
Bhubaneswar Rajdhani Express via Sambalpur City – AC Three Tier coach

Bhubaneswar Rajdhani Express via Sambalpur City – AC First Class coach

Bhubaneswar Rajdhani Express via Sambalpur City – Train board
