= Jharkhand Sampark Kranti Express =

Train in India

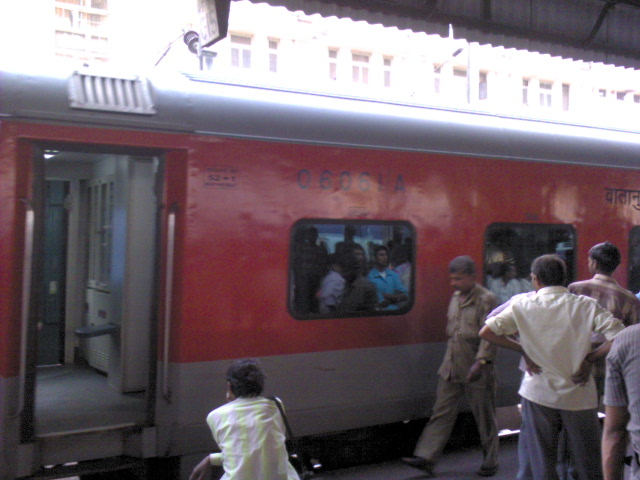
- Jharkhand Sampark Kranti Express At Prayagraj Junction railway station

Overview
- Service type: Sampark Kranti Express
- First service: 22 March 2005; 21 years ago
- Current operator: South Eastern Railway

Route
- Termini: Ranchi Junction (RNC); Anand Vihar Terminal (ANVT)
- Stops: 8
- Distance travelled: 1,296 km (805 mi)
- Average journey time: 19 hrs 40 mins
- Service frequency: Bi-weekly
- Train number: 12825 / 12826

On-board services
- Classes: AC 2 Tier, AC 3 Tier, Sleeper Class, General Unreserved
- Seating arrangements: Yes
- Sleeping arrangements: Yes
- Catering facilities: Available
- Observation facilities: Large windows
- Baggage facilities: Available
- Other facilities: Below the seats

Technical
- Rolling stock: LHB coach
- Track gauge: 1,676 mm (5 ft 6 in); Broad Gauge
- Operating speed: 66 km/h (41 mph) average including halts.
Route map
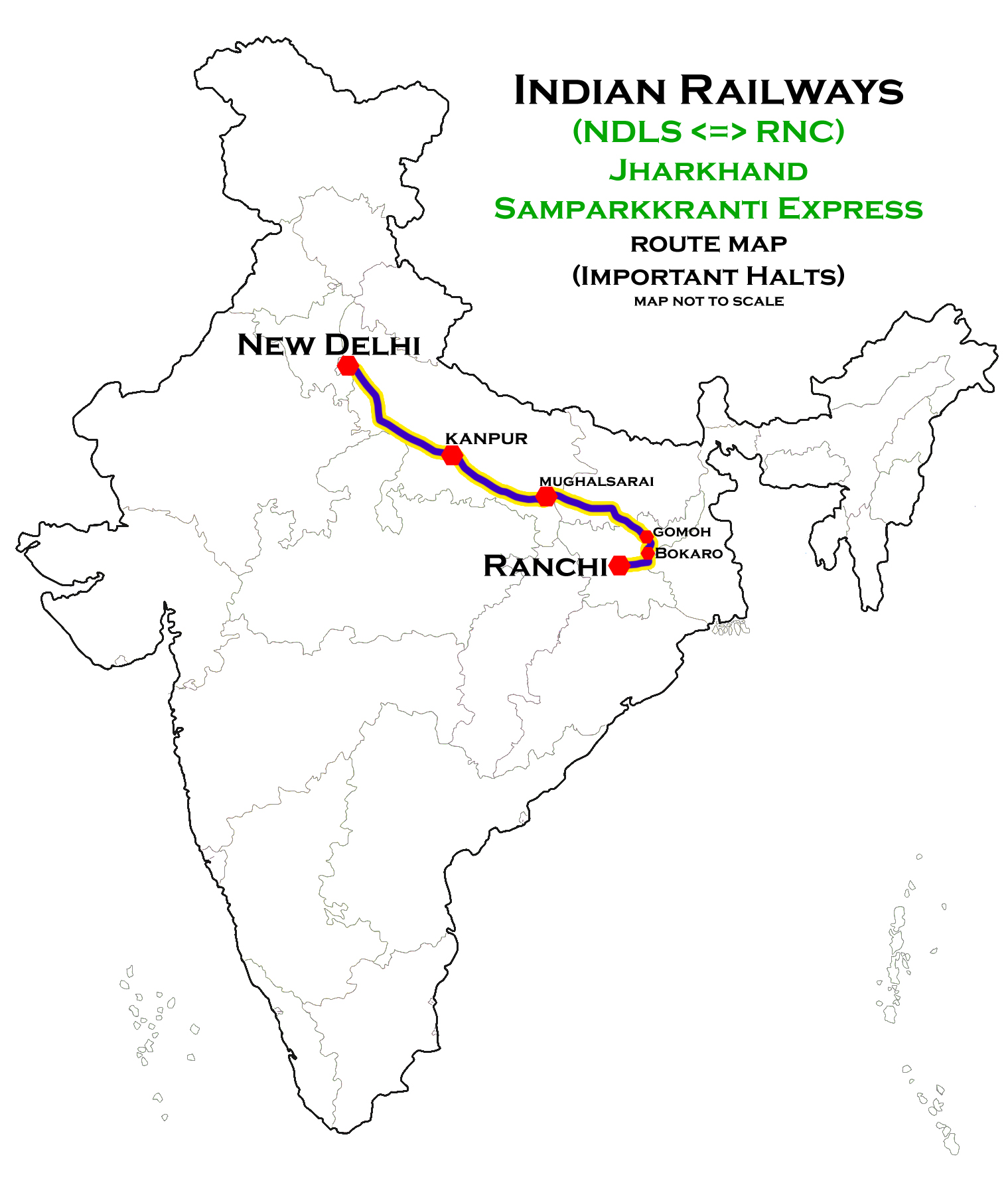
↓ 12825 • 12826 ↑

The 12825 / 12826 Jharkhand Sampark Kranti Express is an Indian Express train. It was introduced along with other Sampark Kranti Expresses during 2003–04.

== Service ==
Twice weekly from Ranchi to New Delhi, the capital of India, via the Grand Chord route.

== Timetable ==
- No. 12825 departs from Ranchi Junction at 23:55 and arrives Anand Vihar Terminal at 19:35.
- No. 12826 departs from Anand Vihar Terminal at 08:00 and arrives Ranchi Junction at 05:15.

== Route & halts ==
- Ranchi Junction
- Muri Junction
- Bokaro Steel City
- Gomoh Junction
- Hazaribagh Road
- Koderma Junction
- Gaya Junction
- Pandit Deen Dayal Upadhyaya Junction
- Kanpur Central
- Anand Vihar Terminal

== Coach composition ==
- 1AC+2AC -1 (HA), 2AC-2, 3AC-3, SL-7, PC-1, GEN-4

== Traction ==
The train is hauled by a Ghaziabad loco shed based WAP-5 / WAP-7 electric locomotive on its entire journey.
