= Dumka–Ranchi Intercity Express =

Train in India

Dumka - Ranchi Intercity Express
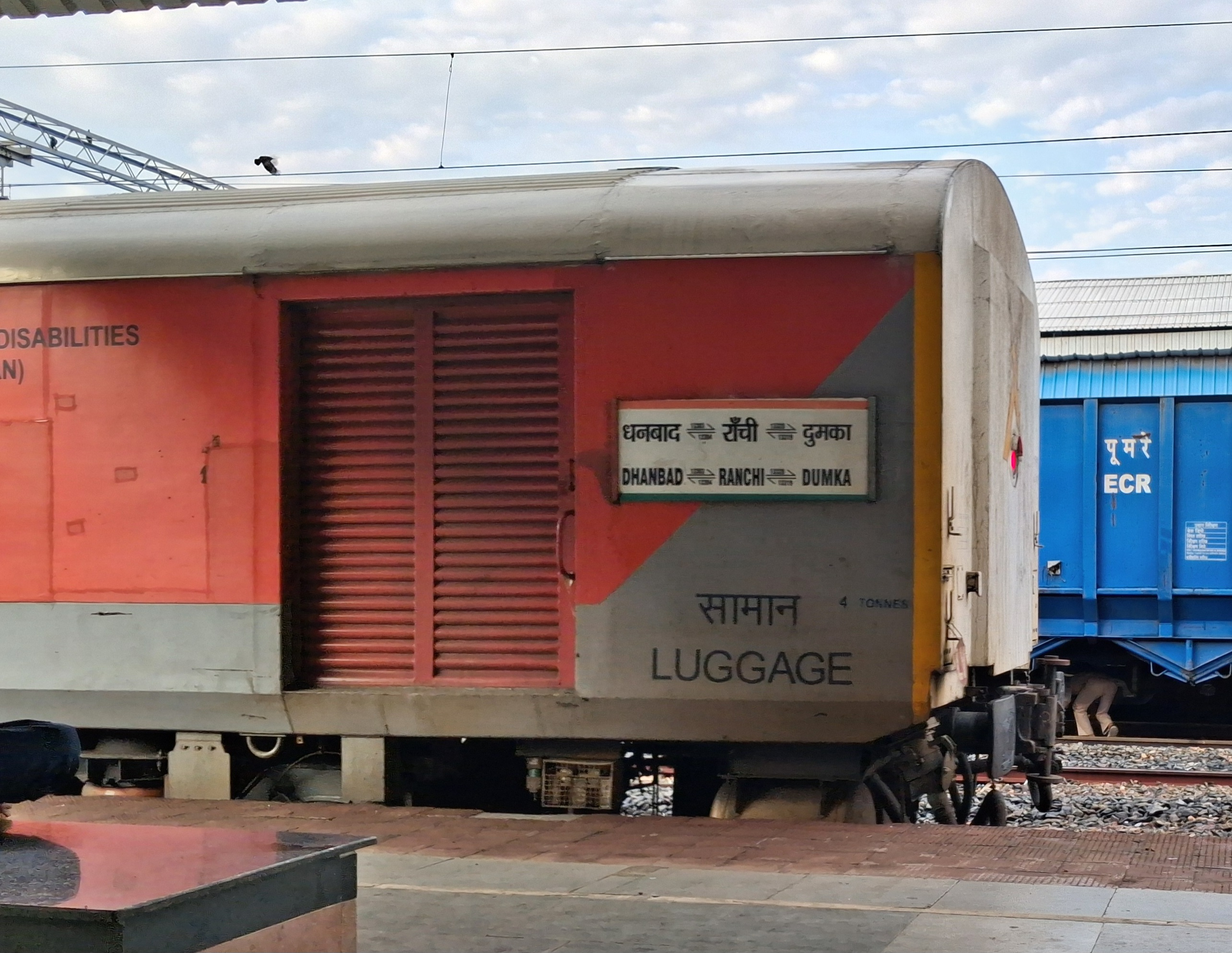
- Dumka Ranchi Intercity Express at Madhupur Junction

Overview
- Service type: Intercity
- First service: 18 January 2011; 15 years ago
- Current operator: East Central Railway zone

Route
- Termini: Dumka; Ranchi Junction
- Stops: 18
- Distance travelled: 395 km (245 mi)
- Average journey time: 8 hours 17 mins
- Service frequency: Daily
- Train number: 13319 / 13320

On-board services
- Class: general unreserved
- Seating arrangements: Yes
- Sleeping arrangements: Yes
- Catering facilities: No

Technical
- Rolling stock: Standard Indian Railways Coaches
- Track gauge: 1,676 mm (5 ft 6 in)
- Operating speed: 40 km/h (25 mph)

The 13319 / 20 Dumka - Ranchi Junction Intercity Express is a Intercity express train belonging to Indian Railways East Central Railway zone that runs between Dumka and Ranchi Junction in India.

It operates as train number 13319 from Dumka to Ranchi Junction and as train number 13320 in the reverse direction serving the states of Jharkhand.

== Coaches ==
The 13319 / 20 Dumka - Ranchi Junction Intercity Express has 10 general unreserved and two SLR (seating with luggage rake) coaches. It does not carry a pantry car coach.

As with most train services in India, coach composition may be amended at the discretion of Indian Railways depending on demand.

== Service ==
The 13319 Dumka - Ranchi Intercity Express covers the distance of 330 km (205 mi) in 8 hours 5 mins (41 km/h) and in 8 hours 35 mins as the 13320 Ranchi - Dumka Intercity Express (41 km/h).

As the average speed of the train is lower than 55 km/h (34 mph), as per railway rules, its fare doesn't includes a Superfast surcharge.

== Schedule ==
Running days : Daily from both the sides.

Train number	Station code	Departure station	Departure time (IST)	Arrival station	Arrival time
13320	RNC	Ranchi	1:20 PM	Dumka	Next day 11:10 PM
13319	DUMK	Dumka	3:30 AM	Ranchi	Next day 12:50 PM

== Routing ==
The 13319 / 20 Dumka - Ranchi Intercity Express runs from Dumka via Jasidih, Dhanbad, Bokaro Steel City to Ranchi.

== Traction ==
As the route is going to electrification, a Mughalsarai Junction based WAP-4 electric locomotive pulls the train up to Jasidih Junction later a Howrah Junction based WDM-3A locomotive pulls the train to its destination.
