= Netaji Subhas Chandra Bose Gomoh railway station =

Railway station in Jharkhand, India

NETAJI SUBHAS CHANDRA BOSE JUNCTION GOMOH

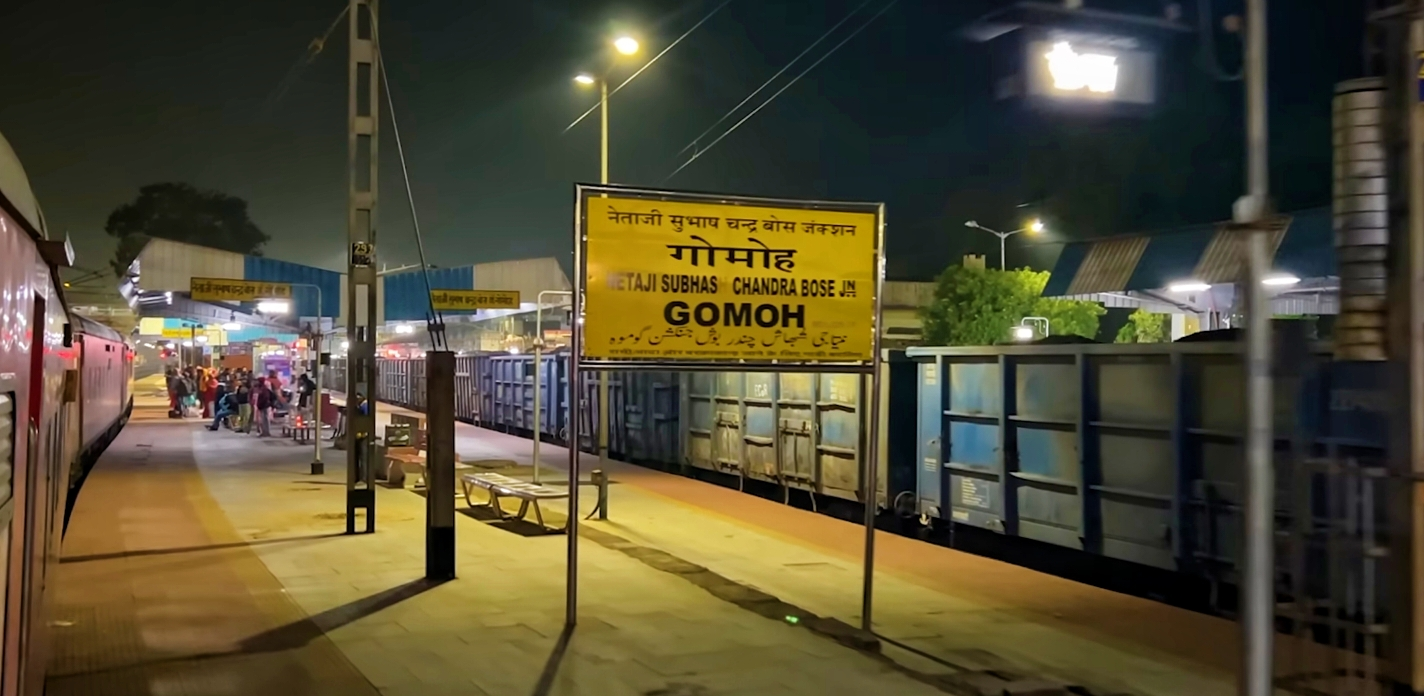
- Gomoh railway station

General information
- Location: Gomoh, Dhanbad district, Jharkhand; India
- Coordinates: 23°52′24″N 86°08′53″E
- Elevation: 239 metres (784 ft)
- System: Indian Railways station
- Owner: Indian Railways
- Operator: East Central Railways
- Lines: Asansol–Gaya section of Grand Chord, Howrah–Gaya–Delhi line and Howrah–Allahabad–Mumbai line, Gomoh–Barkakana branch line, Netaji S.C.Bose Gomoh–Hatia line, Adra–Gomoh line
- Platforms: 6
- Tracks: 9

Construction
- Structure type: Standard on ground station
- Parking: Yes
- Cycle facilities: No
- Accessible: Not Available

Other information
- Status: Functioning
- Station code: GMO
- Zone(s): East Central Railway zone
- Division(s): Dhanbad

History
- Opened: 1906; 120 years ago
- Electrified: 1960–61

Services
Preceding station	Indian Railways	Following station
Matari towards ?	East Central Railway zone Asansol–Gaya section	Nimiaghat towards ?
Terminus	East Central Railway zone Gomoh–Barkakana branch line and Gomoh–Muri branch line	Telo towards ?
Location
- Location within India Location within Jharkhand Location within India
- Interactive map of Netaji SC Bose Gomoh Junction

Gomoh Junction, officially known as Netaji Subhas Chandra Bose Gomoh (station code: GMO) is a railway station in Dhanbad district of the Indian state of Jharkhand. Several branch lines start here: Gomoh–Barkakana branch line, Gomoh–Muri branch line and Adra–Gomoh line. Both Express and Passenger trains have scheduled halts here.

== Etymology ==
Gomoh railway station was renamed as Netaji Subhas Chandra Bose Gomoh railway station in 2009, in honour of Indian freedom fighter and leader Netaji's long journey in Netaji Express (previously known as Kalka Mail) from Gomoh Railway Station out of the British Empire in 1941.

== History ==
The Grand Chord was opened in 1906. In 1927, the Central India Coalfields Railway opened the Gomoh–Barkakana line. Later, the line was amalgamated with East Indian Railway. The construction of the 143-kilometre (89 mi) long Chandrapura–Muri–Ranchi–Hatia line started in 1957 and was completed in 1961.

The Nagpur–Asansol line (then considered the main line of Bengal Nagpur Railway) was extended to Gomoh in 1907.

== Electrification ==
The Dhanbad–Gomoh sector was electrified in 1960−61.

== Loco shed ==
Gomoh Loco Shed has an electric loco shed with capacity to hold 125+ locos. Locos housed at the shed include 53-WAP-7 and 238-WAG-9 locomotives.

== Trains ==
- Bhubaneswar Tejas Rajdhani Express
- Tatanagar–Patna Vande Bharat Express
- Patna - Ranchi Jan Shatabdi Express
- Jharkhand Sampark Kranti Express
- Odisha Sampark Kranti Express
- Jharkhand Swarna Jayanti Express
- Tatanagar–Amritsar Jallianwalla Bagh Express
- Purushottam Express
- Neelachal Express
- Nandan Kanan Express
- Bhubaneswar–Anand Vihar Weekly Superfast Express
- Haldia–Anand Vihar Terminal Superfast Express
- Shalimar–Gorakhpur Express
- Santragachi–Anand Vihar Superfast Express
- Ranchi–Lokmanya Tilak Terminus Weekly Express
- Howrah–Mumbai CSMT Mail (via Gaya)
- Kolkata–Jammu Tawi Express
- Howrah–Gwalior Chambal Express
- Howrah–Mathura Chambal Express
- Patna–Hatia Express
- Ganga Sutlej Express
- Ganga Damodar Express
- Shipra Express
- Netaji Express
- Doon Express
- Kosi Express
- Dumka–Ranchi Intercity Express
- Dhanbad - Sasaram Intercity Express

== Nearest airports ==
- Dhanbad Airport (34 Km)
- Bokaro Airport (35 Km)
- Giridih Airport (70 Km)
- Birsa Munda Airport, Ranchi (136 Km)
