= Howrah–Mumbai CSMT Mail (via Gaya) =

Train in India

Howrah-Mumbai CSMT Mail (via Gaya)

Overview
- Service type: Superfast Express
- First service: 7 March 1870; 156 years ago
- Current operator: Eastern Railway

Route
- Termini: Howrah Junction (HWH); Mumbai CSMT (CSMT)
- Stops: 44
- Distance travelled: 2,160 km (1,342 mi)
- Average journey time: 36 hours 55 minutes
- Service frequency: Daily
- Train number: 12321 / 12322

On-board services
- Classes: AC First, AC 2 tier, AC 3 tier, AC Economy, Sleeper Class, General Unreserved
- Seating arrangements: Yes
- Sleeping arrangements: Yes
- Catering facilities: Available
- Observation facilities: Large windows
- Baggage facilities: Available
- Other facilities: Below the seats

Technical
- Rolling stock: LHB coach
- Track gauge: 1,676 mm (5 ft 6 in)
- Operating speed: 130 km/h (81 mph) maximum, 59 km/h (37 mph) average including halts

The 12321 / 12322 Howrah–Mumbai CSMT Mail (via Gaya), also known as Kolkata Mail during the pre-independence era, is a daily superfast train running between two metro cities: Kolkata (Howrah station) in West Bengal, and Mumbai CSMT in Maharashtra. The train belongs to the mail category and is operated by Indian Railways, with maintenance done and rolling stock provided by Eastern Railway. It receives a high priority on its route.

== History ==
When the Great Indian Peninsular Railway completed the construction of the Bombay - Jabalpur Railway line via Thull Ghat and Itarsi in 1870, it provided the earliest direct connection from Bombay to Calcutta via Allahabad. The inaugural service of the Calcutta Mail was started at 7 March 1870, and the inauguration was attended by The Duke of Edinburgh, the British Viceroy Lord Mayo and the Governor of Bombay, along with the Maharajahs. The train would initially cross the Thull Ghat from Bombay towards Jabalpur and Allahabad, where it would reverse and travel towards Patna to Howrah. After opening of the Howrah - Gaya - Mughalsarai line, the train was diverted to run via Gaya. The train was initially run by East Indian Railway as a passenger service with mail coaches attached.

From the 1890s, to address the quick movement of mail between Bombay and Calcutta, several postal special trains were run by GIPR and EIR. The Imperial Indian Mail was the most famous of these trains, running alongside the Calcutta Mail on a weekly basis. Difference was while the Calcutta Mail would start from Victoria Terminus, the Imperial Indian Mail would start from Ballard Pier Mole railway station because it provided a connection to the British tourists arriving by ships towards Calcutta, the then capital of British India. While the Calcutta Mail would travel to and reverse at Allahabad, the Imperial Indian Mail would instead take the Allahabad Chheoki bypass towards Mughalsarai. The Calcutta Mail served all types of passengers along its route, while the Imperial Indian Mail, with its First Class and Restaurant Cars, were catered more to the British tourists and was the pinnacle of luxury at the time.

Due to World War II, the Imperial Indian Mail along with Calcutta Mail was shut down for service, for an indefinite period of time. When the war ended in 1945, regular service resumed for the Calcutta Mail, which is the current iteration of the Howrah Mumbai Mail. This train's name was changed to Kolkata Mail to avoid confusion with the Mumbai Mail via Nagpur, though now it is named as the Mumbai Mail, same as its other counterpart.

Maintenance and operation of this train went to Eastern Railway after its formation in 1952. The train numbers, from its inception in 1870, were kept as 3 UP from Howrah to Allahabad and 4 DN from Allahabad to Howrah; numbers would change in GIPR as 7 DN from Allahabad to Victoria Terminus and 8 UP from Victoria Terminus to Allahabad. This continued till 1989, when the 4 digit numbering scheme prompted the change of train numbers from 3 UP / 4 DN to 3003/3004 from Howrah to Bombay. After its conversion to Superfast Express, numbers were changed again to 2321/2322. In 2010, due to the 5 digit numbering scheme directive, train number was again changed to its current numbers, 12321/12322.

On 1 April 2016, the Kolkata Mail was diverted permanently to run via Allahabad Chheoki instead of taking reversal at Allahabad. This has led many to confuse the Kolkata Mail with the Imperial Indian Mail, which used to do the same.

== Timings ==
12321 Howrah Mumbai Mail via Gaya leaves Howrah every day at 11:35 pm, and arrives at Mumbai CSMT every third day at 01:35 pm.

12322 Mumbai Howrah Mail via Gaya leaves Mumbai CSMT every day at 10:15 pm, and arrives at Howrah every third day at 11:40 am.

== Route & halts ==
This train was the first through train from Mumbai to Kolkata when the Howrah–Prayagraj–Mumbai line was opened in 1870.

In its current iteration, the train has 46 halts and runs from Howrah Junction via Barddhaman Junction, Durgapur railway station, Asansol Junction, Dhanbad Junction, Gomoh Junction, Parasnath railway station, Koderma Junction, Gaya Junction, Dehri-on-Sone railway station, Sasaram Junction, Pt. Deen Dayal Upadhyaya Junction, Mirzapur railway station, Prayagraj Chheoki Junction, Satna Junction, Katni Junction, Gadarwara, Itarsi Junction, Khandwa, Bhusaval Junction, Manmad Junction, and Kalyan Junction, to Mumbai CSMT.

== Coach composition ==
Kolkata Mail is composed of 22 LHB Coaches:

- 1 AC First Class cum AC Two Tier
- 1 AC Two Tier
- 5 AC Three Tier
- 1 AC Economy
- 1 AC Buffet Car (Pantry Car)
- 8 Sleeper Class
- 3 General Second Class
- 1 Divyangjan, Luggage and Brake Van
- 1 Generator Luggage and Brake Van

The services of Mumbai Mail are operated using 4 rakes and are maintained at Howrah and Mumbai.

Since 12321/12322 is a mail express service, there is facility of railway mail service provided by India Post available on this train.

== Traction ==
It is hauled by a Howrah Loco Shed based head on generation equipped WAP-7 electric locomotive on its entire journey.

== See also ==
- Dedicated Intercity trains of India
