= Howrah–Gaya Vande Bharat Express =

Vande Bharat Express train route in India

Howrah Junction – Gaya Junction Vande Bharat Express

Overview
- Service type: Vande Bharat Express
- Locale: West Bengal, Jharkhand and Bihar
- First service: 15 September 2024 (Inaugural); 18 September 2024; 14 months ago (Commercial)
- Current operator: Eastern Railways (ER)

Route
- Termini: Howrah Junction (HWH); Gaya Junction (GAYA)
- Stops: 05
- Distance travelled: 459 km (285 mi)
- Average journey time: 05 hrs 40 mins
- Service frequency: Six days a week (Note: Except Thursdays)
- Train number: 22303 / 22304
- Line used: Howrah–Gaya–Delhi line (till Gaya Junction)

On-board services
- Classes: AC Chair Car, AC Executive Chair Car
- Seating arrangements: Airline style; Rotatable seats
- Sleeping arrangements: No
- Catering facilities: On board Catering
- Observation facilities: Large windows in all coaches
- Entertainment facilities: On-board WiFi; Infotainment System; Electric outlets; Reading light; Seat Pockets; Bottle Holder; Tray Table
- Baggage facilities: Overhead racks
- Other facilities: Kavach

Technical
- Rolling stock: Vande Bharat 2.0
- Track gauge: Indian gauge 1,676 mm (5 ft 6 in) broad gauge
- Electrification: 25 kV 50 Hz AC Overhead line
- Operating speed: 81 km/h (50 mph) (Avg.)
- Average length: 384 metres (1,260 ft) (16 coaches)
- Track owner: Indian Railways
- Rake maintenance: Howrah Jn (HWH)

The 22303/22304 Howrah - Gaya Vande Bharat Express is India's 59th Vande Bharat Express train, connecting the metropolitan and twin city of Kolkata, Howrah in West Bengal with the religious city of Gaya in Bihar.

This express train was inaugurated on September 15 2024, by Prime Minister Narendra Modi via video conferencing from the capital city of Ranchi instead of physically inaugurating at Tatanagar Junction in Jharkhand due to continuous rains in Jamshedpur.

== Overview ==
This train is currently operated by Indian Railways, connecting Howrah Jn, Durgapur, Asansol Jn, Dhanbad Jn, Parasnath, Koderma Jn and Gaya Jn. It is currently operated with train numbers 22303/22304 on 6 days a week basis.

== Rakes ==
It is the fifty-sixth 2nd Generation Vande Bharat Express train which was designed and manufactured by the Integral Coach Factory at Perambur, Chennai under the Make in India Initiative.

== Service ==
The 22303/22304 Howrah - Gaya Vande Bharat Express currently operates 6 days a week, covering a distance of 458 km (285 mi) in a travel time of 05 hrs 40 mins with average speed of 81 km/h (50 mph). The Maximum Permissible Speed (MPS) is 130 km/h (81 mph).

== See also ==
- Vande Bharat Express
- Tejas Express
- Gatiman Express
- Howrah Junction railway station
- Gaya Junction railway station
