= Ispat Nagar railway station =

Railway station in Jharkhand

Ispat Nagar Railway Station

General information
- Location: Ispat Nagar, Bokaro Steel City, Jharkhand; India
- Coordinates: 23.7089°N 86.1428°E
- Elevation: 200 metres (660 ft)
- System: Indian Railways station
- Owner: Indian Railways
- Operator: South Eastern Railway
- Platforms: 2
- Tracks: 5 (Double electrified broad gauge)
- Connections: Auto stand

Construction
- Structure type: Standard (on ground station)
- Parking: Yes
- Cycle facilities: Yes

Other information
- Status: Functioning
- Station code: IPTN
- Zone(s): South Eastern Railway
- Division(s): Adra

History
- Opened: 1982
Location

Ispat Nagar Railway Station is a railway station near Sector 9, Bokaro Steel City, Jharkhand on the Adra–Bokaro Steel City branch line. It serves Bokaro Steel City. The station offers two platforms.South Eastern Railway planned passenger and Express train to stop at this station.
