= Asansol–Gaya section =

Railway line in India

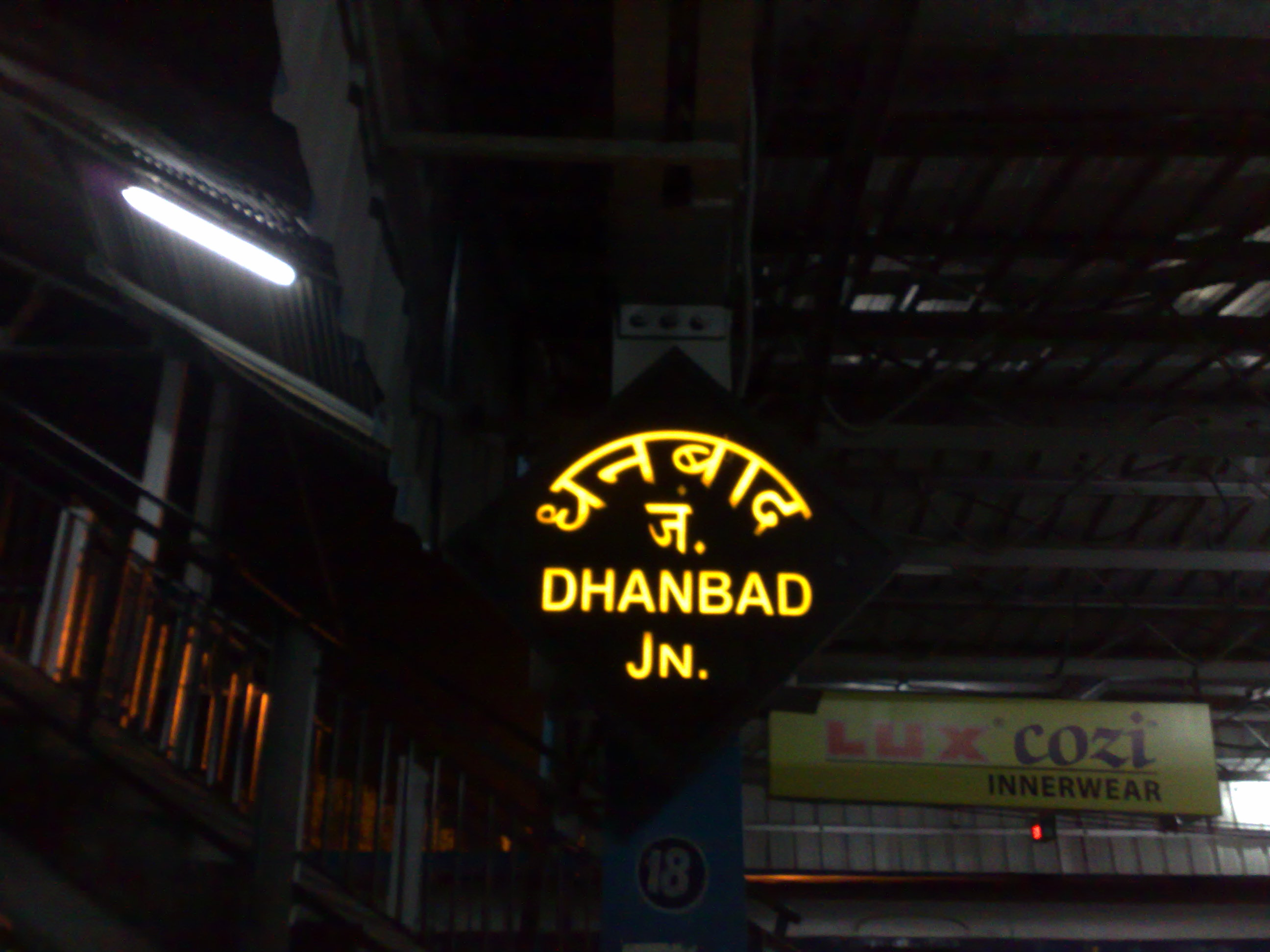
- Dhanbad Junction is an important railway station on Asansol–Gaya section

Overview
- Status: Operational
- Owner: Indian Railways
- Locale: West Bengal, Jharkhand, Bihar
- Termini: Asansol; Gaya
- Stations: 38

Service
- System: Electrified
- Operator(s): Eastern Railway, East Central Railway

History
- Opened: 1907

Technical
- Line length: 267 km (166 mi)
- Number of tracks: 2
- Track gauge: 5 ft 6 in (1,676 mm) broad gauge
- Electrification: Yes
- Operating speed: 130 km/h

The Asansol–Gaya section is a railway line connecting Asansol and Gaya in India. This 267-kilometre-long (166 mi) track is part of the Grand Chord, Howrah–Gaya–Delhi line and Howrah–Allahabad–Mumbai line. This section includes the NSC Bose Gomoh–Barkakana line. It is under the jurisdiction of Eastern Railway and East Central Railway. The section links to South Eastern Railway through Bokaro Steel City and Adra.

== History ==
=== Main line ===
The Bardhaman–Asansol line was first extended to Barakar in 1858 and then in 1894 East Indian Railway Company extended the line to Jharia and Katras, opening up the Jharia Coalfield. Dhanbad emerged as a premier coal loading area. One railway-related source says that the line from Sitarampur to Dhanbad was built in 1880.

==== Gurpa-Gujhandi ====
Once the rail link from Howrah to Delhi was completed in 1866, the East Indian Railway was making constant endeavour to reduce the distance of the Howrah–Delhi main line. After several surveys, one in 1888–89 and two more subsequently, a route was determined from Dhanbad to Mughal Sarai via Koderma and Gaya. The major works in this section were a bridge across the Son River at Dehri, and tunnelling and ghat line construction between Gurpa and Gujhandi.

The 22-kilometre (14 mi) Gujhandi (altitude 370 m)–Gurpa (altitude 193 m) section, 10 kilometres (6.2 mi) west of Koderma, is a ghat (mountain/hill slope), with the Koderma Plateau sloping down to the Gaya plain.

The Grand Chord was opened on 6 December 1906 by Lord Minto, then Viceroy and Governor General of India with a function at Gujahandi. The Viceroy and Lady Minto travelled to Gaya, from where they travelled in a special observation car to Gujhandi. Two special trains, running from Howrah, carried the invitees. The Viceroy screwed on a silver bolt with a silver spanner to formally complete the line.

A repeat of the historic event was organized by East Central Railway on 6 December 2006, with a special heritage train "Grand Chord ki Rani", pulled by a 1965 steam engine, carrying the guests from Gaya to Gujhandi.

=== Branch lines ===
Several years before the Grand Chord was built, a connection from the Howrah–Delhi main line to Gaya was developed in 1900 (presumably the Patna–Gaya line) and the South Bihar Railway Company (operated by EIR) had laid a line from Lakhisarai to Gaya in 1879. Track doubling of the 130-kilometre-long (81 mi) Kiul–Gaya section was announced in the Railway Budget for 2010–2011.

The Bengal Nagpur Railway system was connected to the East Indian Railway Company lines in 1889, thus connecting Asansol to Adra. In 1907 Adra was connected to the Grand Chord at Gomoh.

The construction of the 143-kilometre-long (89 mi) Chandrapura–Muri–Ranchi–Hatia line started in 1957 and was completed in 1961.

In 1902, a branch line of EIR was opened from Sone East Bank (later renamed Son Nagar) to Daltonganj. With the development of South Karanpura Coalfield, the Central India Coalfields Railway opened a line from Gomoh to Barkakana in 1927 and from Barkakana to Daltonganj in 1929. These lines were subsequently taken over by EIR.

== Electrification ==
Electrification of the stretch of mainline of this section from Asansol to Netaji SC Bose Gomoh was completed in 1960–61. Electrification of the stretch from Netaji SC Bose Gomoh to Gaya was completed in 1961–62.

On the Gomoh–Barkakana branch line electrification was done from both ends: Gomoh to Phusro in 1986–87, Barkakana to Danea in 1996–97, Danea to Gomia and Gomia to Jarandih in 1997–98.

In 1965, Asansol–Bareilly Passenger was the first long-distance train on Eastern Railway to be hauled by an AC loco.

The Gaya–Jahanabad sector was electrified in 2002–2003. Completion of electrification of the 97-kilometre-long (60 mi) Patna–Gaya rail route before the end of 2003 was announced by the railway minister Nitish Kumar.

== Loco sheds ==
Asansol is home to the oldest electric loco shed of Indian Railways. It houses WAG-5 and WAM-4 electric locomotives.

Netaji SC Bose Gomoh has an electric loco shed with capacity to hold 125+ locos. Locos housed at the shed include WAG-7, WAG-9, WAG-9I, WAP-7. WAP-7 locos serve the prestigious Howrah Rajdhani Express.

Bokaro Steel City has a diesel loco shed with WDM-2 and WDM-3A locos. It has a large yard for Bokaro Steel Plant.

== Speed limits ==
Most of the Asansol–Gaya section is classified as 'A' class line where trains can run up to 160 km per hour but in certain sections speeds may be limited to 120–130 km per hour. The Howrah Rajdhani (between Howrah and New Delhi) travels at an average speed of 85.8 km per hour and the Sealdah Rajdhani (between Sealdah and New Delhi) travels at an average speed of 84.70 km per hour.

== Railway reorganisation ==
In 1952, Eastern Railway, Northern Railway and North Eastern Railway were formed. Eastern Railway was formed with a portion of East Indian Railway Company, east of Mughalsarai and Bengal Nagpur Railway. Northern Railway was formed with a portion of East Indian Railway Company west of Mughalsarai, Jodhpur Railway, Bikaner Railway and Eastern Punjab Railway. North Eastern Railway was formed with Oudh and Tirhut Railway, Assam Railway and a portion of Bombay, Baroda and Central India Railway. East Central Railway was created in 1996–97.

== Trains ==
The following trains are famous trains of this section

- Netaji Express
- Garba Superfast Express
- Pratap Express
- Shabd Bhedi Superfast Express
- Ajmer–Sealdah Express
- Howrah-Bikaner Superfast Express
- Howrah-Jodhpur Express
- Howrah-Mumbai CSMT Mail (via Gaya)
- Howrah-Gaya Vande Bharat Express
- Howrah–Lalkuan Express
- Howrah-Bikaner Weekly Superfast Express
- Poorva Express (via Gaya)
- Durgiana Express
- Kolkata–Agra Cantonment Express
- Kolkata-Jammu Tawi Express
- Kolkata-Gwalior Superfast Express
- West Bengal Sampark Kranti Express
- Jallianwalla Bagh Express
- Sealdah-Jammu Tawi Humsafar Express
- Howrah-New Delhi Rajdhani Express (via Gaya)
- Sealdah-New Delhi Rajdhani Express
- Parasnath Express
- Howrah–Agra Cantonment Chambal Express
- Howrah–Gwalior Chambal Express
- Howrah–Mathura Chambal Express
- Shipra Express
- Howrah-Barmer Superfast Express
- Doon Express

While There are also a lot of Passenger and Express trains that serves the section.
