= Ranchi Junction railway station =

Railway junction station in Jharkhand

RANCHI JUNCTION

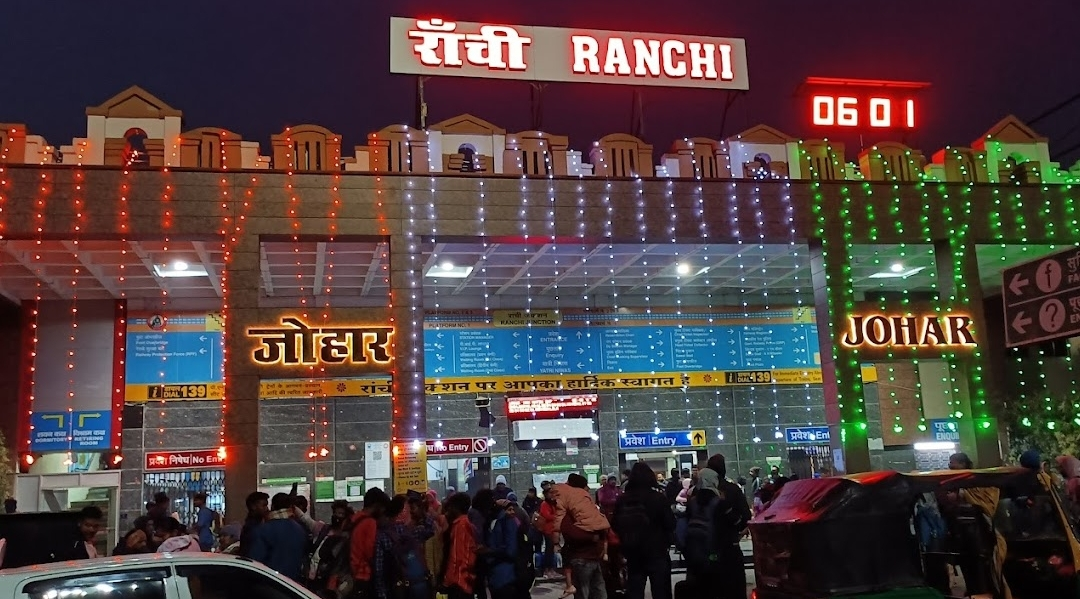
- Entrance of Ranchi Junction railway station in Morning

General information
- Location: Ranchi, Ranchi district, Jharkhand; India
- Coordinates: 23°20′57″N 85°20′10″E
- Elevation: 629.00 metres (2,063.65 ft)
- System: Indian Railways station
- Owner: Indian Railways
- Operator: South Eastern Railway
- Lines: Netaji S.C.Bose Gomoh–Hatia main line; Ranchi-Tori line; Koderma–Hazaribagh–Barkakana–Ranchi line
- Platforms: 5 (main line), 1 (terminus) and total 6 platforms
- Tracks: 8

Construction
- Structure type: At grade
- Parking: Available
- Accessible: Available

Other information
- Status: Active
- Station code: RNC
- Zone(s): South Eastern Railway
- Division(s): Ranchi
- Classification: NSG-2

History
- Opened: 1908; 118 years ago
- Rebuilt: 2009
- Electrified: Double electrified BG (Tripling on process)
- Former names: East Indian Railway

Passengers
- 1,00,000 per day

Other services
Route map
Location
- Location within India Location within Jharkhand
- Interactive map of Ranchi Junction

Ranchi Junction railway station (station code: RNC) is the NSG-2 category railway station serving the capital city of Ranchi in the Ranchi district in the Indian state of Jharkhand. Ranchi station is also the headquarters of the Ranchi division of the South Eastern Railway zone of the Indian Railways. The Ranchi Junction railway station is connected to most of the major cities in India by the railway network.

Ranchi has trains running to Delhi, Kolkata, Dhanbad, Varanasi, Rourkela, Hyderabad, Bangalore, Mumbai, Pune, Chennai, Kamakhya, Deoghar, Bhagalpur, Jammu, Surat, Eranakulam and Patna. The city is a major railway hub and has four major stations: Ranchi Junction, Hatia, Tatisilwai and Namkon. It is one of the top hundred booking stations.

The total number of trains that pass through Ranchi (RNC) junction is 120.

== History ==
In November 1907, Ranchi was brought onto India's railway map with the Purulia–Ranchi narrow-gauge line. First train whistle for Purulia was blown in 1907, now 60 thousand passengers travel every day.

In 1911, it was extended up to Lohardaga.

In 2003, the Ranchi division was carved out from the existing Adra railway division of the South Eastern Railway zone. As of 2012 Ranchi station was renovated and developed along the lines of Jaipur railway station. The facade of the Ranchi station has been improved in February 2012. In February 2012 two new platforms were added to the Ranchi station along with a mechanical interlocking system.

== Platforms ==
There are six platforms in Ranchi Junction. The platforms are interconnected with two foot overbridges (FOB) and an escalator.

== Connections ==
Ranchi Junction is located close to the bus terminal and domestic airport providing transport to important destinations of Jharkhand. Automatic ticket vending machines have been installed to reduce the queues for train tickets at the station. The railway medical unit provides health facilities is located near Muri Junction. Ranchi–New Giridih Intercity Express, the only train running with a Vistadome coach in the state of Jharkhand, terminates at Ranchi. The nearest airports to Ranchi Junction are:

- Birsa Munda Airport, Ranchi 5 kilometres (3.1 mi)
- Gaya Airport 179 kilometres (111 mi)
- Lok Nayak Jayaprakash Airport, Patna 420 kilometres (260 mi)
- Netaji Subhash Chandra Bose International Airport, Kolkata 365 kilometres (227 mi)
- Kazi Nazrul Islam Airport, Durgapur 243 Kilometres (150.9 mi)
- Deoghar Airport, Deoghar 247 Kilometres (153.4 mi)
- Sonari Airport, Jamshedpur 122 Kilometres (75.8 mi)
- Bokaro Airport, Bokaro Steel City 105 Kilometres (65.2 mi) (Under Construction)

== Trains ==
Ranchi junction is served by several superfast, express, intercity and passenger trains from different cities, Following are some of the premium train services:

- Podanur - Dhanbad Amrit Bharat Express
- Dhanbad - Alappuzha Express
- Ranchi Rajdhani Express
- Patna - Ranchi Vande Bharat Express
- Ranchi–Varanasi Vande Bharat Express
- Ranchi–Howrah Vande Bharat Express
- Ranchi–New Delhi Garib Rath Express
- Howrah–Ranchi Shatabdi Express
- Patna - Ranchi Jan Shatabdi Express
- Jharkhand Sampark Kranti Express
- Jharkhand Swarna Jayanti Express

== See also ==
- Ranchi
- Indian Railways
