= Netaji S.C.Bose Gomoh–Hatia line =

Railway route in India

Netaji S.C.Bose Gomoh–Hatia main line
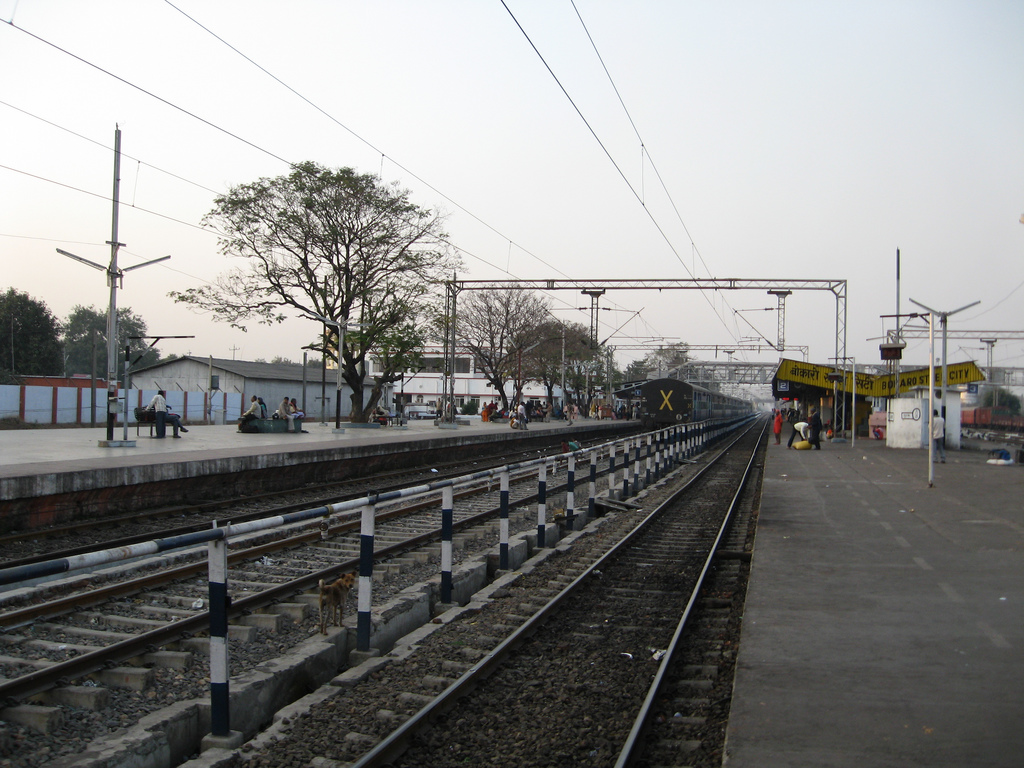
- Bokaro Steel City is an important Railway Station on Netaji S.C.Bose Gomoh–Hatia line

Overview
- Status: Operational
- Owner: Indian Railways
- Locale: Jharkhand, West Bengal
- Termini: NSC Bose Gomoh; Hatia

Service
- System: Double Electrified
- Operator(s): East Central Railway, South Eastern Railway
- Rolling stock: WAP-7 of Tatanagar shed and Howrah shed, WAP-4 of Howrah shed, WAM-4 of Tatanagar Shed and Bokaro Shed and WDM-3A of Bokaro shed

History
- Opened: 1961

Technical
- Line length: 152 km (94 mi)
- Track gauge: 5 ft 6 in (1,676 mm) broad gauge
- Electrification: Yes
- Operating speed: 110 km/h (68 mph) km/h
- Highest elevation: 628 metres above the sea level

The Netaji S.C.Bose Gomoh–Hatia line is a railway line connecting NSC Bose Gomoh and Hatia in the Indian state of Jharkhand. It is under the jurisdiction of East Central Railway and South Eastern Railway.

== History ==
The 2 ft 6 in (762 mm)-wide narrow-gauge Purulia–Ranchi line was opened by Bengal Nagpur Railway in 1907.

In 1907 Adra was connected to the Grand Chord at Gomoh with a 1,676 mm (5 ft 6 in) wide [[5 ft 6 in (1,676 mm) broad gauge|broad-gauge]] line. The construction of the 143 kilometres (89 mi) long broad gauge Chandrapura–Muri–Ranchi–Hatia line was started in 1957 and was completed in 1961. The construction of this line included the conversion of the narrow-gauge Kotshila–Ranchi line to broad gauge.

The narrow-gauge Purulia–Kotshila sector was converted to broad gauge in 1992.

== Electrification ==
The Gomoh–Chandrapura–Phusro sector was electrified in 1957–58, Rajabera-Bokaro Steel City in 1986–87, Bokaro Steel City yard in 1988–89, Radhagaon–Muri–Kita in 1998–99, Kita–Namkom in 2000–2001, Namkum–Ranchi–Hatia in 2001–2002, Purulia–Kotshila in 1998–99.

== Loco sheds ==
Netaji SC Bose Gomoh has an electric loco shed with capacity to hold 125+ locos. Locos housed at the shed include WAG-7, WAG-9, WAG-9I, WAP-7. WAP-7 locos serve the prestigious Howrah Rajdhani Express.

Bokaro Steel City has a diesel loco shed with WDM-2 and WDM-3A locos. It has a large yard for Bokaro Steel Plant.

== Railway reorganisation ==
In 1952, Eastern Railway was formed with a portion of East Indian Railway Company, east of Mughalsarai and Bengal Nagpur Railway. In 1955, South Eastern Railway was carved out of Eastern Railway. It comprised lines mostly operated by BNR earlier. East Central Railway was created in 1996–97.

Some major trains on this route:-

- Purushottam Express
- Ranchi Rajdhani Express
- Bokaro Steel City–Bhubaneswar Garib Rath Express
- Bhubaneswar Rajdhani Express
- Howrah–Ranchi Shatabdi Express
- Odisha Sampark Kranti Express
- Jharkhand Sampark Kranti Express
- Sambalpur–Jammu Tawi Express
- Jharkhand Swarna Jayanti Express
- Tatanagar–Amritsar Jallianwalla Bagh Express
- Ahmedabad–Kolkata Express
- Shaktipunj Express
- Howrah–Bhopal Weekly Express
- Ranchi–New Delhi Garib Rath Express
- Sambalpur–Varanasi Express
- Ranchi–Kamakhya Express

Rail sections of this route:-

- Hatia–Ranchi section
- Ranchi–Johna section and Ranchi–Gautamdhara section (tracks split due to hilly terrain)
- Johna-Muri section and Gautamdhara–Muri section (tracks meet in Muri)
- Muri–Kotshila section
- Kotshila–Bokaro Steel City section
- Bokaro Steel City–Chandrapura section
- Chandrapura-Gomoh section
