= Pratap Express =

Train in India

Pratap Superfast Express
Overview
- Service type: High Priority Superfast Express
- Status: Operating
- First service: 7 January 2010; 16 years ago
- Current operator: North Western Railway

Route
- Termini: Bikaner Junction (BKN); Kolkata (KOAA)
- Stops: 19
- Distance travelled: 1,887 km (1,173 mi)
- Average journey time: 30 hours 35 mins
- Service frequency: Weekly
- Train number: 12495 / 12496

On-board services
- Classes: AC 2 Tier, AC 3 Tier, Sleeper Class, General Unreserved
- Seating arrangements: Yes
- Sleeping arrangements: Yes
- Catering facilities: On-board catering, E-catering
- Observation facilities: Large windows
- Baggage facilities: Available
- Other facilities: Below the seats

Technical
- Rolling stock: LHB coach
- Track gauge: 1,676 mm (5 ft 6 in)
- Operating speed: 70 km/h (43 mph) average including halts.
Route map
- via Nagaur, Jaipur, Bharatpur, Agra, Kanpur, Prayagraj, Gaya, Dhanbad, Barddhaman

The 12495 / 12496 Pratap Superfast Express is a superfast express train belonging to Indian Railways – North Western Railway zone that runs between Bikaner Junction and Kolkata Chitpur in India. It often is delayed nearly by four hours late. The train received its LHB coach.

It operates as train number 12495 from Bikaner Junction to Kolkata and as train number 12496 in the reverse direction, serving the states of Rajasthan, Uttar Pradesh, Bihar, Jharkhand and West Bengal.

== Coaches ==
This train runs with modern LHB coaches.

The 12495/12496 Pratap Express has one AC 2 tier, six AC 3 tier, seven Sleeper class, four Unreserved/General and two EOG coaches. It does not carry a pantry car .

== Service ==
The 12495 Pratap Superfast Express covers the distance of 1,888 km (1,173 mi) in 31 hours 05 mins (59.06 km/h) and in 30 hours 35 mins as 12496 Pratap Superfast Express (60.64 km/h).

As the average speed of the train is above 65 km/h (40 mph), as per Indian Railways rules, its fare includes a Superfast surcharge.

== Time table ==
Station Code	Station Name	Arrival	Departure
BKN	Bikaner Junction	---	06:00
NOK	Nokha	06:44	06:46
NGO	Nagaur	07:20	07:25
DNA	Degana Junction	08:39	08:42
MKN	Makrana Junction	09:12	09:15
JP	Jaipur Junction	11:15	11:25
BKI	Bandikui Junction	12:58	13:00
BTE	Bharatpur Junction	14:03	14:05
AH	Achhnera Junction	14:28	14:30
AF	Agra Fort	15:05	15:30
TDL	Tundla Junction	16:45	16:50
CNB	Kanpur Central	19:30	19:35
PRYJ	Prayagraj Junction	22:05	22:10
DDU	Pt DD Upadhyaya Junction	02:28	02:38
GAYA	Gaya Junction	04:45	04:50
KQR	Koderma Junction	06:26	06:28
DHN	Dhanbad Junction	08:40	08:45
ASN	Asansol Junction	09:56	10:01
DGR	Durgapur	10:29	10:31
BWN	Barddhaman Junction	11:22	11:24
KOAA	Kolkata	13:05	---

== Operation ==
- 12495 Pratap Express runs from Bikaner Junction every Thursday reaching Kolkata on Friday .
- 12496 Pratap Express runs from Kolkata every Friday reaching Bikaner Junction on Sunday.

== Traction ==
earlier before WAP-7 locomotive upgrade this train was used to run with WAP-5 and now Both trains are hauled by a Bhagat Ki Kothi Loco Shed or Ghaziabad Loco Shed-based WAP-7 electric locomotive from Bikaner to Kolkata and vice versa.

== Rake sharing ==
The train shares its rake with 22473/22474 Bandra Terminus–Bikaner Superfast Express.
