= Giridih Airport =

Airport in Giridih, Jharkhand, India

- IATA: none; ICAO: VE41

Summary
- Airport type: Public
- Owner: State Government
- Operator: Airport Authority of India
- Serves: Giridih
- Location: Giridih, Jharkhand

Runways
Direction	Length		Surface
Direction	ft	m	Surface
11/29	2.953	900	Asphalt

Giridih Airport, also known as Boro Aerodrome, is a public airport that is located in Giridih, Jharkhand, India. The airport currently does not have any scheduled commercial services and is used only by private companies and government aircraft.

The ownership of Airport belongs to the State Government of Jharkhand. The State Government has planned to develop the airport for operation of small aircraft under Regional Connectivity Scheme (RCS) and has requested Airports Authority of India (AAI) to assess the feasibility for proposed development and operationalization of the airport. Accordingly, a multidisciplinary team has visited the site and a prefeasibility report for the same has been submitted to Govt. of Jharkhand on 16.05.2018. No bid has been received from any airline operator for connecting Giridih airport during the first two rounds of RCS bidding.

The airport's expansion is underway by acquiring 25.04 acres of private land a cost of 60 crores for the commencement of scheduled passenger services.

== See also ==
- Birsa Munda Airport
- Deoghar Airport
