= Muri Junction railway station =

Railway station in Jharkhand, India

MURI JUNCTION

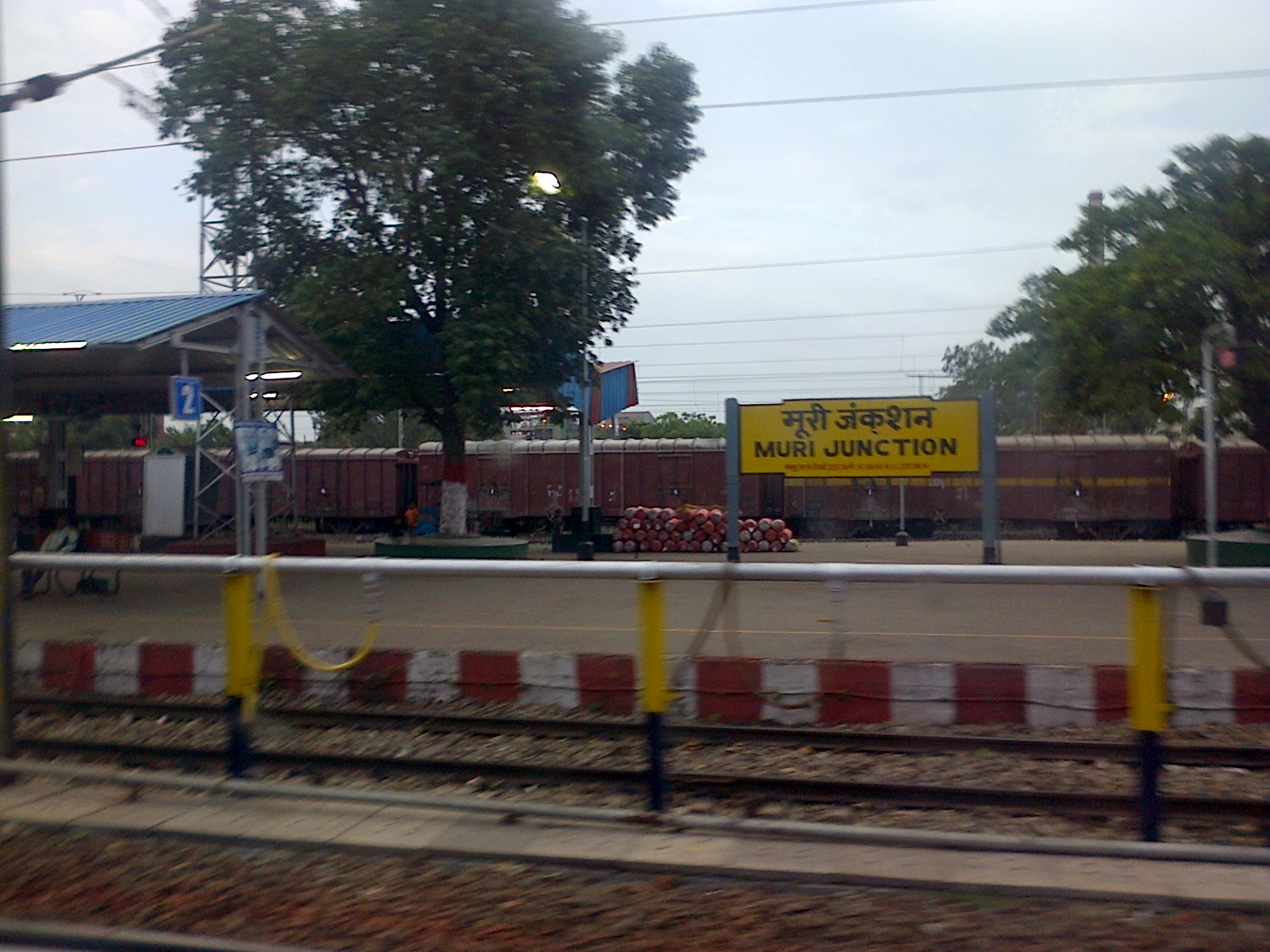

General information
- Location: Muri, Ranchi district, Jharkhand; India
- Coordinates: 23°22′43″N 85°52′0″E
- Elevation: 257 metres (843 ft)
- System: Indian Railways station
- Owner: Indian Railways
- Operator: South Eastern Railway
- Lines: Netaji S.C.Bose Gomoh–Hatia main line and Barkakana-Muri-Chandil line
- Platforms: 3
- Tracks: 3

Construction
- Structure type: At grade
- Parking: Available
- Cycle facilities: No
- Accessible: Available

Other information
- Status: Functional
- Station code: MURI
- Zone(s): South Eastern Railway
- Division(s): Ranchi
- Classification: NSG-4
- Website: www.irctc.co.in/nget/train-search

History
- Opened: 1907; 119 years ago
- Former names: Bengal Nagpur Railway
Services
Preceding station	Indian Railways	Following station
Terminus	South Eastern Railway zone Gomoh–Muri branch line	Tulin towards Gomoh
Terminus	South Eastern Railway zone Muri–Ranchi line	Silli towards Ranchi Junction
Illoo towards Tatanagar Junction	South Eastern Railway zone Tatanagar–Barkakana branch line	Harubera towards Asansol Junction
Route map
Location
- Location within Jharkhand Location within India
- Interactive map of Muri Junction

Muri Junction, station code MURI, is the railway station serving the remote town of Muri in the Ranchi district in the Indian state of Jharkhand. Muri Junction belongs to the Ranchi division of the South Eastern Railway zone of the Indian Railways.

== History ==
The Purulia–Ranchi line was opened as a narrow-gauge railway of BNR in 1907.

In 1927, Bengal Nagpur Railway opened the 116-kilometre (72 mi) Chandil–Barkakana section to traffic.

The construction of the 143 kilometres (89 mi)-long Chandrapura–Muri–Ranchi–Hatia line started in 1957 and was completed in 1961.

== Further extension ==
The railways have proposed a Silli–Iloo line bypassing Muri after construction of which trains from Ranchi can run to Tatanagar and Howrah without locomotive reversal at Muri, thus avoiding a delay of more than 30 minutes for an engine change at Muri.

== Facilities ==
The major facilities available are waiting rooms, retiring room, computerized reservation facility, reservation counter, vehicle parking, etc. The vehicles are allowed to enter the station premises. Security personnel from the Government Railway Police (GRP) are present for security. A railway medical unit providing health facilities is located near Muri Junction.

=== Platforms ===
There are three platforms which are interconnected with a foot overbridge (FOB).

== Trains ==
Many Express and Passenger trains pass through Muri Junction. Muri also serves as terminal station for few of them. Several electrified local passenger trains also run from Ranchi to neighboring destinations on frequent intervals. Muri is connected to major cities of India- Kolkata, New Delhi, Mumbai, Chennai, Dhanbad, Renukoot, Surat, Guwahati, Patna, Kanpur, Puri, Jammu Tawi, etc.

== Nearest airports ==
The nearest airports to Muri Junction are:

1. Birsa Munda Airport, Ranchi 63 kilometres (39 mi)
2. Gaya Airport, Gaya 200 kilometres (120 mi)
3. Lok Nayak Jayaprakash Airport, Patna 289 kilometres (180 mi)
4. Netaji Subhash Chandra Bose International Airport, Kolkata 308 kilometres (191 mi)

== See also ==
- Ranchi
