= Ranchi railway division =

Railway division of India

Ranchi railway division is one of the four railway divisions under the jurisdiction of South Eastern Railway zone of the Indian Railways. This railway division was formed on 1 April 2003 and its headquarter is located at Ranchi in the state of Jharkhand of India.

Kharagpur railway division, Chakradharpur railway division and Adra railway division are the other three railway divisions under SER Zone headquartered at Garden Reach, Calcutta.

== List of railway stations and towns ==
The list includes the stations under the Ranchi railway division and their station category.

Category of station	No. of stations	Names of stations
A1	-	
A	2	Ranchi Junction, Hatia
B	19	-
D suburban station	4	Muri Junction, Tatilsilwai, Namkon, Argora
E	20	-
F	9	-
G halt station	-	-
Total	55	-

Stations closed for Passengers -
