= Barkakana–Muri–Chandil line =

Railway route in India

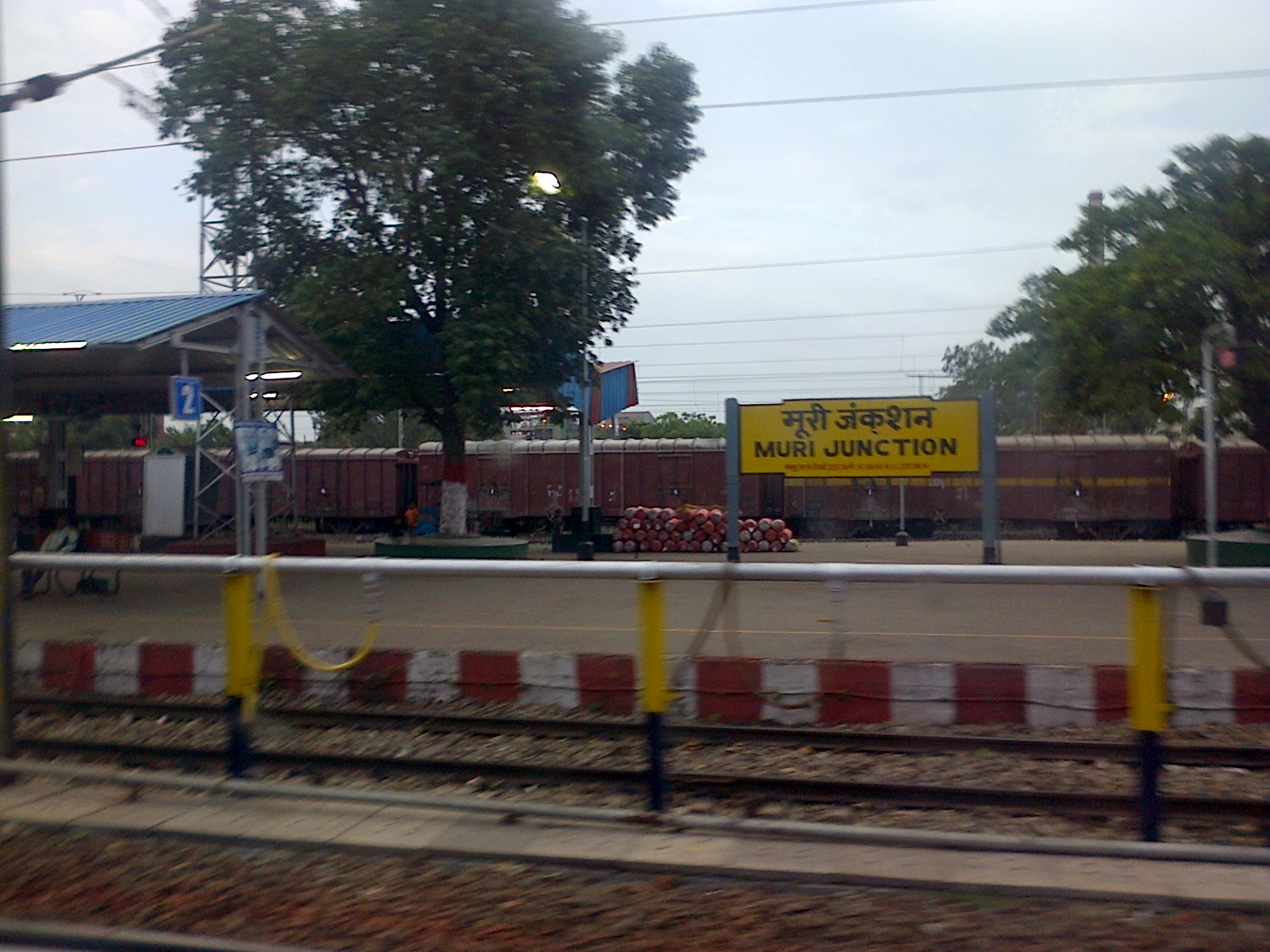
- Muri Junction, an important railway station on Barkakana–Muri–Chandil line

Overview
- Status: Operational
- Owner: Indian Railways
- Locale: Jharkhand
- Termini: Chandil; Barkakana

Service
- Type: Rail line
- System: Indian Railways
- Operator: South Eastern Railway

History
- Opened: 1927 onwards

Technical
- Track length: 126 km (78 mi)
- Track gauge: 5 ft 6 in (1,676 mm) broad gauge
- Electrification: 1996–97 with 25 kV AC overhead line

The Barkakana–Muri–Chandil line is an Indian railway line connecting Barkakana and Muri with Chandil on the Asansol–Tatanagar–Kharagpur line. This 126-kilometre (78 mi) track is under the jurisdiction of South Eastern Railway.

== History ==
The Bengal Nagpur Railway was formed in 1887 for the purpose of upgrading the Nagpur Chhattisgarh Railway and then extending it via Bilaspur to Asansol, in order to develop a shorter Howrah–Mumbai route than the one via Allahabad. The Bengal Nagpur Railway main line from Nagpur to Asansol, on the Howrah–Delhi main line, was opened for goods traffic on 1 February 1891.

The Chandil–Barkakana line was opened for traffic in 1927.

=== Route diversion ===
With the construction of the Chandil Dam as a part of the Subarnarekha Multpurpose project, the traffic between Chandil and Tiruldih was diverted to a newly constructed line via Haslang & Bakarkudi in 1990 as the older route via Pakridih & Ichhadih became submerged in the dam waters.

== Electrification ==
The Chandil–Gondabihar, Gondabihar–Tiruldih and Barkakana–Ramgarh Halt sectors were electrified in 1996–97. The Tiruldih–Ramgarh sector was electrified in 1997–98.
