= Palamu Express =

Train in India

Overview
- Service type: Express
- First service: 11 November 1981; 44 years ago
- Current operator: East Central Railway

Route
- Termini: Barkakana (BRKA); Patna Junction (PNBE)
- Stops: 30
- Distance travelled: 492 km (306 mi)
- Average journey time: 13h 35m
- Service frequency: Daily (Note: Runs seven days in a week for every direction.)
- Train number: 13347 / 13348

On-board services
- Classes: AC 2 Tier, AC 3 Tier, Sleeper Class, General Unreserved
- Seating arrangements: Yes
- Sleeping arrangements: No
- Auto-rack arrangements: Overhead racks
- Catering facilities: E-catering
- Observation facilities: Large windows
- Baggage facilities: No
- Other facilities: Below the seats

Technical
- Rolling stock: LHB coach
- Track gauge: 1,676 mm (5 ft 6 in)
- Operating speed: 40 km/h (25 mph) average including halts.

The 13347 / 13348 Palamu Express is an express train belonging to East Central Railway zone that runs between Barkakana Junction and Patna Junction in India. It is currently being operated with 13347/13348 train numbers on a daily basis.

== Service ==
The 13347/Palamu Express has an average speed of 40 km/h and covers 492 km in 12h 10m. The 13348/Palamu Express has an average speed of 42 km/h and covers 492 km in 11h 20m.

== Route and halts ==
The important halts of the train are:

- Barkakana Junction
- Patratu
- Tori Junction
- Latehar
- Barwadih
- Daltonganj
- Garwa Road Junction
- Dehri-on-Sone
- Anugraha Narayan Road
- Gaya Junction
- Jehanabad
- Patna Junction.

== Coach composition ==
The train has LHB rakes with max speed of 130 kmph. The train consists of 20 coaches :

- 1 AC ll Tier
- 3 AC III Tier
- 7 Sleeper Coaches
- 7 General
- 2 SLRD (Seating cum Luggage Rake)

== Traction ==
Both trains are hauled by a DDU Loco Shed-based WAP-4 electric locomotive from Patna Junction to Barkakana Junction and vice versa.

== Direction reversal ==
Train reverses its direction once at;

- Dehri On Sone

== Rake sharing ==
The train shares its rake with 13331/32 Dhanbad–Patna Intercity Express, 13349/50 Patna-Singrauli Express and 03249/50 Patna Rajgir Special.

Train No.	Train name	Departs	Arrival
13331	Dhanbad-Patna Intercity Express	DHN@08:05 AM Daily	PNBE@05:30 PM Daily
13350	Patna-Singrauli Express	PNBE@07:15 AM Daily	SGRL@07:00 AM Daily
13349	Singrauli-Patna Express	SGRL@08:15 PM Daily	PNBE@09:00 AM Daily
03250	Patna-Rajgir Special	PNBE@09:20 AM Daily	RGD@12:20 PM Daily
03249	Rajgir-Patna Special	RGD@03:10 PM Daily	PNBE@06:20 PM Daily
13348	Palamu Express	PNBE@08:20 PM Daily	BRKA@07:50 AM Daily
13347	Palamu Express	BRKA@06:30 PM Daily	PNBE@06:50 AM Daily
13332	Patna-Dhanbad Intercity Express	PNBE@08:30 AM Daily	DHN@04:50 PM Daily

== See also ==
- Rajendra Nagar Terminal railway station
- Barkakana Junction railway station
- Maurya Express
