= Ranchi–Varanasi Express =

Train in India

Overview
- Service type: Express
- Current operator: South Eastern Railway zone

Route
- Termini: Ranchi Junction (RNC); Varanasi Junction (BSB)
- Stops: 29
- Distance travelled: 577 km (359 mi)
- Average journey time: 12h 45m
- Service frequency: Four days (Note: Runs Four days in a week for every direction.)
- Train number: 18611/18612

On-board services
- Classes: Sleeper Class, General Unreserved
- Seating arrangements: No
- Sleeping arrangements: Yes
- Catering facilities: On-board catering E-catering
- Observation facilities: ICF coach
- Entertainment facilities: No
- Baggage facilities: No
- Other facilities: Below the seats

Technical
- Rolling stock: 2
- Track gauge: 1,676 mm (5 ft 6 in)
- Operating speed: 46 km/h (29 mph), including halts

The Ranchi–Varanasi Express is an express train belonging to South Eastern Railway zone that runs between Ranchi Junction and Varanasi Junction in India. It is currently being operated with 18611/18612 train numbers on four days in a week basis.

== Service ==
The 18611/Ranchi–Varanasi Express has an average speed of 45 km/h and covers 577 km in 12h 45m. 18612/Varanasi–Ranchi Express has an average speed of 43 km/h and covers 577 km in 13h 25m.

== Route and halts ==
The important halts of the train are:

- Ranchi Junction
- Muri Junction
- Ramgarh Cantonment
- Barkakana Junction
- Patratu
- Tori Junction
- Latehar
- Barwadih Junction
- Daltonganj
- Dehri-on-Sone
- Sasaram Junction
- Bhabua Road
- Pt. Deen Dayal Upadhyaya Junction
- Kashi
- Varanasi Junction

== Coach composite ==
The train has standard LCF rakes with max speed of 110 kmph. The train consists of 11 coaches:

- 4 Sleeper coaches
- 5 General
- 2 Generators cum Luggage/parcel van

== Traction ==
Both trains are hauled by a Santragachi Loco Shed-based WAP-4 electric locomotive from Ranchi to Varanasi and vice versa.

== See also ==
- Varanasi Junction railway station
- Ranchi Junction railway station
- Ranchi–Mumbai LTT Express
- Sambalpur–Varanasi Express
