= Ranchi–Chopan Express =

Train in India

Ranchi-Chopan Express
Overview
- Service type: Express
- First service: 17 December 2009; 15 years ago
- Current operator(s): South Eastern Railway

Route
- Termini: Ranchi (RNC); Chopan (CPU)
- Stops: 19
- Distance travelled: 476 km (296 mi)
- Average journey time: 9 hours 40 minutes
- Service frequency: Tri-weekly (Note: Runs three days in a week for every direction.)
- Train number(s): 18613 / 18614

On-board services
- Class(es): General Unreserved
- Seating arrangements: Yes
- Sleeping arrangements: No
- Catering facilities: No
- Observation facilities: Large windows
- Baggage facilities: No
- Other facilities: Below the seats

Technical
- Rolling stock: ICF coach
- Track gauge: 1,676 mm (5 ft 6 in)
- Operating speed: 49 km/h (30 mph) average including halts.

The 18613 / 18614 Ranchi-Chopan Express is an express train belonging to South Eastern Railway zone that runs between Ranchi Junction and Chopan in India. It is currently being operated with 18613/18614 train numbers on tri-weekly basis.

== Service ==
The 18613/Ranchi - Chopan Express has an average speed of 47 km/h and covers 476 km in 10h 5m. The 18614/Chopan - Ranchi Express has an average speed of 42 km/h and covers 476 km in 11h 25m.

== Route and halts ==
The important halts of the train are:

- Ranchi Junction
- Muri Junction
- Barkakana Junction
- Patratu
- Latehar
- Barwadih Junction
- Garwa Road Junction
- Garhwa
- Renukoot
- Chopan

== Coach composite ==
The train has standard ICF rakes with a max speed of 110 kmph. The train consists of 12 coaches :

- 10 General Unreserved
- 2 Seating cum Luggage Rake

== Traction ==
Both trains are hauled by a Santragachi Loco Shed based WAP-4 electric locomotive from Ranchi to Chopan and vice versa.

== See also ==
- Ranchi Junction railway station
- Chopan railway station
