= Latehar railway station =

Railway station in Jharkhand

General information
- Location: National Highway 39, Latehar, Jharkhand; India
- Coordinates: 23.7253°N 84.4680°E
- Elevation: 381 metres (1,250 ft)
- System: Indian Railways station
- Owner: Indian Railways
- Operator: East Central Railway
- Platforms: 2
- Tracks: 4 (double electrified broad gauge)
- Connections: Auto stand

Construction
- Structure type: Standard (on-ground station)
- Parking: No
- Cycle facilities: No

Other information
- Status: Functioning
- Station code: LTHR
- Zone(s): East Central Railway
- Division(s): Dhanbad
Location

Latehar railway station is a small railway station in Latehar district, Jharkhand. Its code is LTHR. It serves Latehar city. The station consists of two platforms. The platforms are not well sheltered. It lacks many facilities including water and sanitation.

In June 2015, the Palamu Express was derailed near Latehar by a Maoist explosive attack. There were no casualties.

== Major trains ==
- Dhanbad - Mumbai LTT Weekly Express
- Bhopal - Dhanbad Express
- Kishanganj–Ajmer Garib Nawaz Express
- Santragachi–Ajmer Weekly Express
- Barkakana–Varanasi Passenger
- Barkakana–Dehri-on-Sone Passenger
- Barwadih–Netaji Subhas Chandra Bose Gomoh Passenger
- Howrah–Bhopal Weekly Express
- Ranchi–Chopan Express (unreserved)
- Chopan–Netaji Subhas Chandra Bose Gomoh Passenger
- Sambalpur–Jammu Tawi Express
- Muri Express
- Jharkhand Swarna Jayanti Express (via Barkakana)
- Ranchi–New Delhi Garib Rath Express
- Palamau Express
- Ranchi–Varanasi Express
- Sambalpur–Varanasi Express
- Shaktipunj Express
