= Sambalpur–Jammu Tawi Express =

Train in India

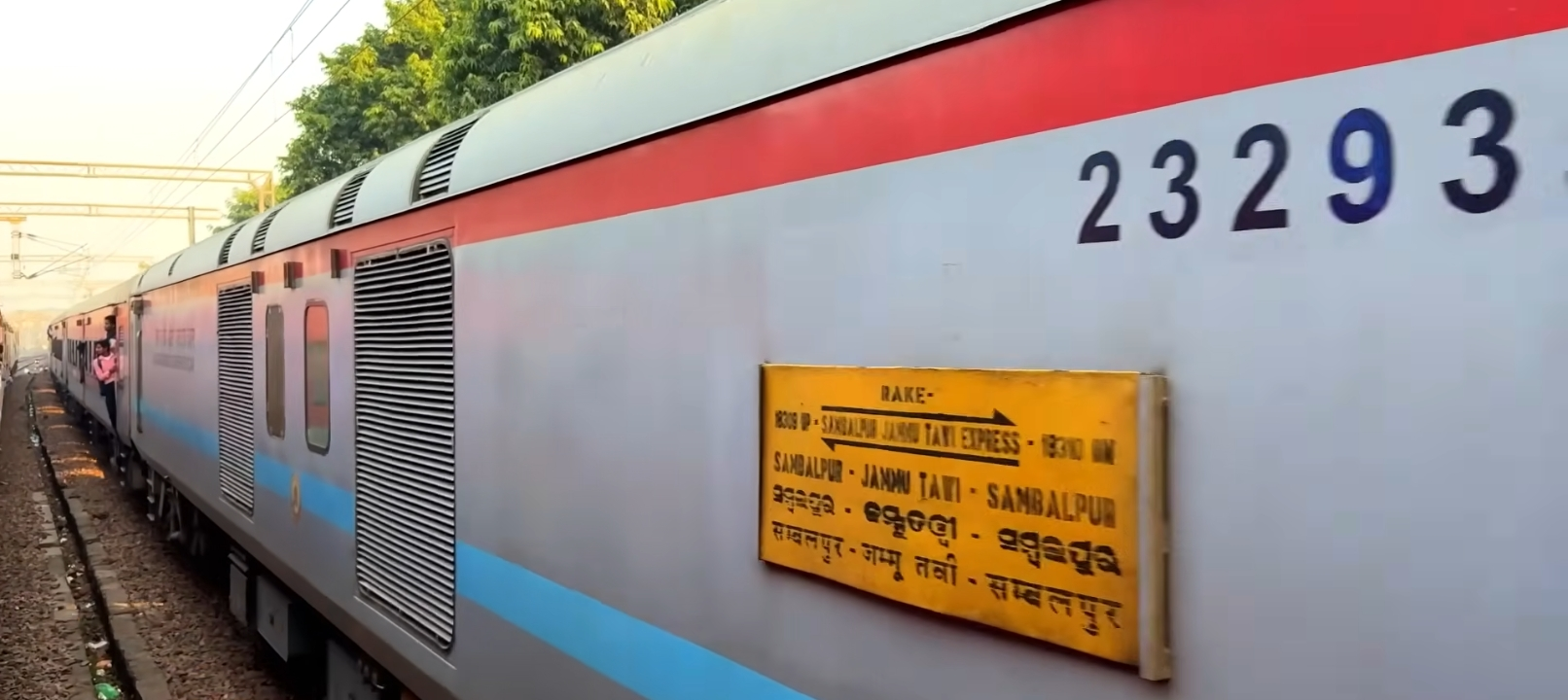
- Jammu -Sambalpur Express At Tundla Junction

Overview
- Service type: Express
- First service: 5 May 1980; 45 years ago
- Current operator: East Coast Railway

Route
- Termini: Sambalpur (SBP); Jammu Tawi (JAT)
- Stops: 66
- Distance travelled: 2,348 km (1,459 mi)
- Average journey time: 51h 10m
- Service frequency: 4 days a week (Note: Runs four days in a week for every direction.)
- Train number: 18309 / 18310

On-board services
- Classes: AC 2 tier, AC 3 tier, Sleeper class, General Unreserved
- Seating arrangements: No
- Sleeping arrangements: Yes
- Catering facilities: Available
- Observation facilities: Large windows
- Baggage facilities: No
- Other facilities: Below the seats

Technical
- Rolling stock: LHB coach
- Track gauge: 1,676 mm (5 ft 6 in)
- Operating speed: 47 km/h (29 mph) average including halts

The 18309 / 18310 Sambalpur–Jammu Tawi Express is an Express train belonging to East Coast Railway zone that runs between Sambalpur Junction and Jammu Tawi in India. It is currently being operated with 18309/18310 train numbers on a daily basis.

== Service ==
The 18309/Sambalpur–Jammu Tawi Express has an average speed of 46 km/h and covers 2348 km in 51h 25m. The 18310/Jammu Tawi–Sambalpur Express has an average speed of 47 km/h and covers 2348 km in 49h 40m.

== Route and halts ==
The important halts of the train are:

- Sambalpur Junction
- Jharsuguda Junction
- Bamra
- Rajgangpur
- Rourkela Junction
- Hatia
- Ranchi Junction
- Muri Junction
- Ramgarh Cantonment
- Barkakana Junction
- Barwadih Junction
- Daltonganj
- Garwa Road Junction
- Chopan
- Chunar Junction
- Prayagraj Junction
- Kanpur Central
- Tundla Junction
- Aligarh Junction
- Ghaziabad Junction
- Delhi Junction
- Ambala Cantonment Junction
- Ludhiana Junction
- Phillaur Junction
- Phagwara Junction
- Jalandhar City Junction
- Amritsar Junction
- Pathankot Junction
- Jammu Tawi.

== Coach composition ==
The train has LHB rakes with a maximum speed of 130 km/h. The train consists of 21 coaches:

- 1 AC II Tier
- 1 Parcel Van
- 3 AC III Tier
- 9 Sleeper coaches
- 1 Pantry car
- 4 General Unreserved
- 2 Seating cum Luggage Rake.

== Traction ==
Both trains are hauled by a Santragachi Loco Shed-based WAP-7 electric locomotive from Sambalpur to Jammu Tawi.

== Slip coaches ==
The train used to get attached/detached to/from 18101/18102 Muri Express at Muri Junction to continue till Jammu Tawi. This system was in use till March 2020.

== Direction reversal ==
The train reverses its direction twice at:

- Amritsar Junction
- Pathankot Junction.

== See also ==
- Phillaur Junction
- Rourkela Junction railway station
- Jammu Tawi railway station
- Tatanagar–Amritsar Jallianwalla Bagh Express
- Muri Express
