= Visakhapatnam–Banaras Express =

Train in India

Overview
- Service type: Express
- Locale: Andhra Pradesh, Odisha, Jharkhand, Bihar & Uttar Pradesh
- Current operator: South Coast Railway

Route
- Termini: Visakhapatnam (VSKP); Banaras (BSBS)
- Stops: 40
- Distance travelled: 1,405 km (873 mi)
- Average journey time: 29 hrs 05 mins
- Service frequency: Bi-weekly (Note: Runs two days in a week for every direction.)
- Train number: 18523 / 18524

On-board services
- Classes: AC First Class, AC 2 Tier, AC 3 Tier, Sleeper class, General Unreserved
- Seating arrangements: No
- Sleeping arrangements: Yes
- Catering facilities: Available
- Observation facilities: Large windows
- Baggage facilities: No
- Other facilities: Below the seats

Technical
- Rolling stock: LHB coach
- Track gauge: 1,676 mm (5 ft 6 in)
- Operating speed: 48 km/h (30 mph) average including halts.
Route map
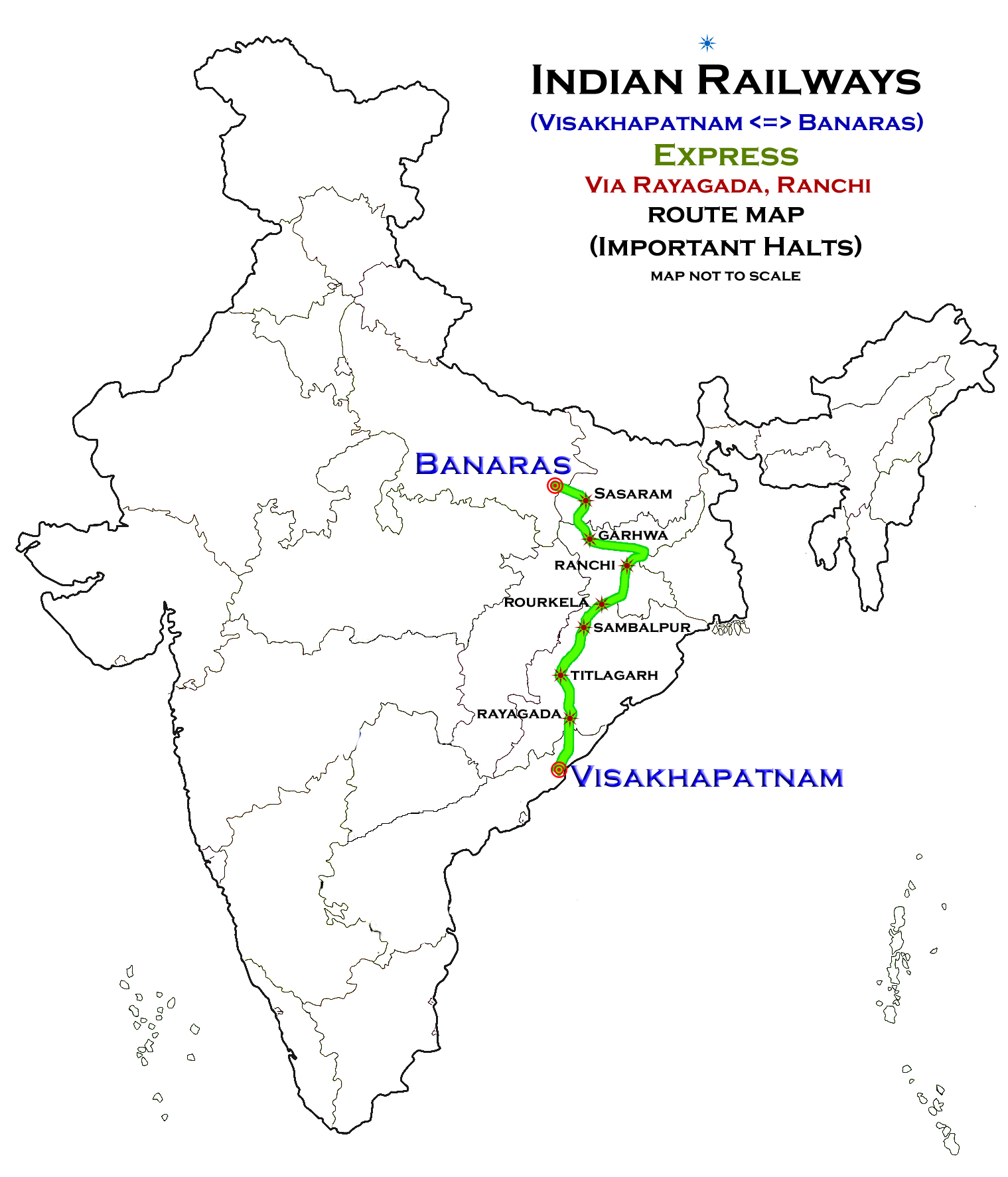

The 18311 / 18312 Visakhapatnam–Banaras Express is an express train belonging to South Coast Railway zone that runs between Visakhapatnam and Banaras in India. It is currently being operated with 18311/18312 train numbers on twice in a week basis.

== Service ==
The 18311 Visakhapatnam–Banaras Express has an average speed of 48 km/h and covers 1405 km in 29h 05m. 18312 Banaras–Visakhapatnam Express has an average speed of 49 km/h and covers 1405 km in 28h 30m.

== Route and halts ==
The important halts of the train are:

- Visakhapatnam
- Kottavalasa Junction
- Vizianagaram Junction
- Bobbili Junction
- Parvathipuram
- Rayagada
- Muniguda
- Kesinga
- Titlagarh Junction
- Balangir Junction
- Bargarh Road
- Sambalpur Junction
- Jharsuguda Junction
- Rourkela Junction
- Hatia
- Ranchi Junction
- Muri Junction
- Ramgarh Cantonment
- Barkakana Junction
- Patratu
- Tori Junction
- Latehar
- Barwadih Junction
- Daltonganj
- Dehri-on-Sone
- Sasaram Junction
- Bhabua Road
- Mughalsarai Junction
- Kashi
- Varanasi Junction
- Banaras

== Coach composition ==
The train has standard LHB rakeswith max speed of 110 kmph. The train consists of 21 coaches:

- 1 AC First Class
- 2 AC II Tier
- 5 AC III Tier
- 1 AC III Tier Economy
- 6 Sleeper coaches
- 4 General
- 1 EOG
- 1 SLR

== Traction ==
Both trains are hauled by a Visakhapatnam Loco Shed-based WAP-7 electric locomotive from Visakhapatnam to Banaras, and vice versa.

== Rake sharing ==
No RSA single rake Primary Maintenance at Visakhapatnam.

== See also ==
- Banaras railway station
- Sambalpur Junction railway station
- Bhubaneswar–Anand Vihar Weekly Superfast Express
- Howrah–Sambalpur Superfast Express
- Ranchi–Varanasi Express
