= Barkakana Junction railway station =

Railway station in Jharkhand, India

BARKAKANA JUNCTION

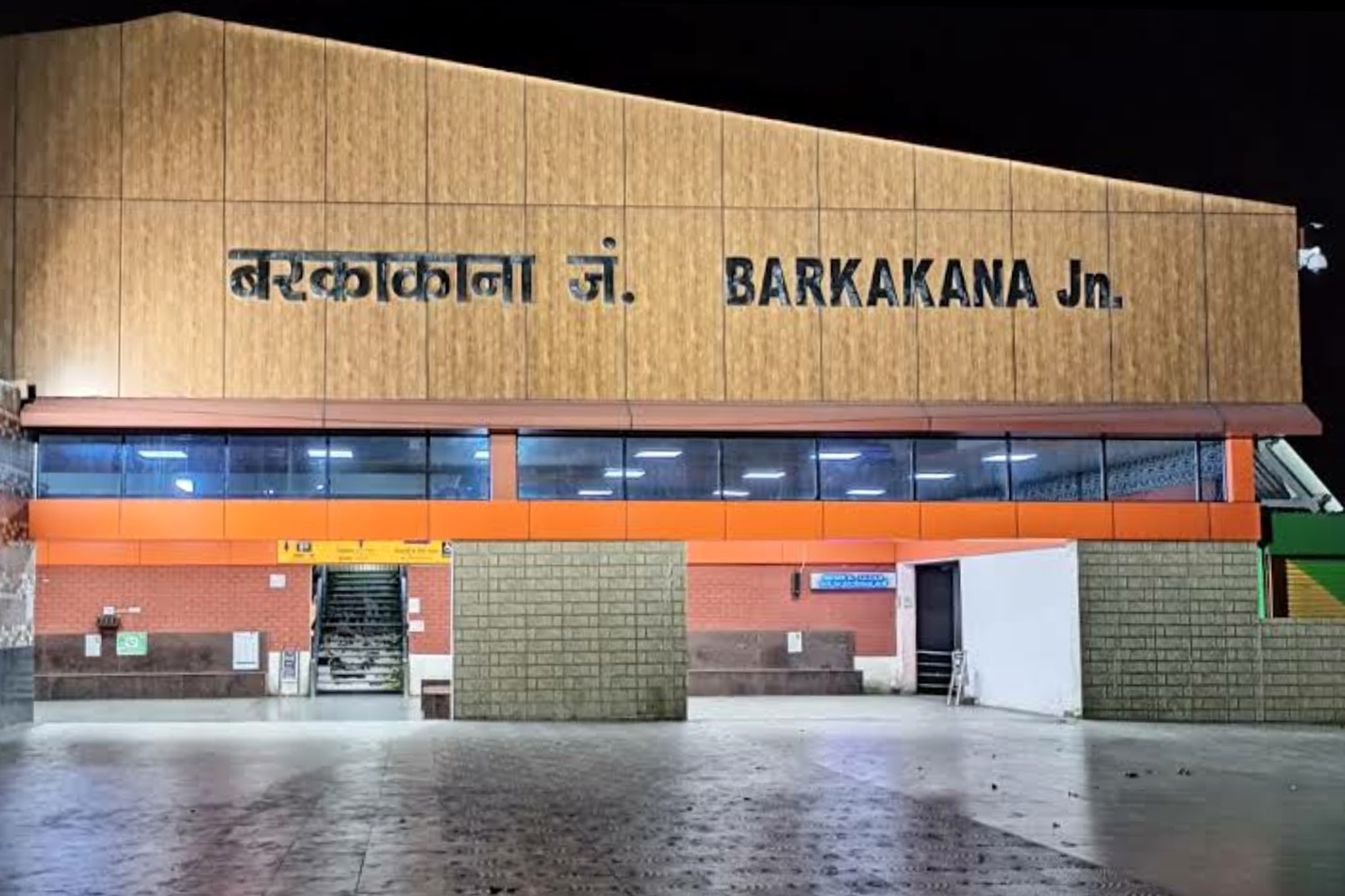
- Barkakana Junction railway station building

General information
- Location: Barkakana, Ramgarh district, Jharkhand; India
- Coordinates: 23°37′27″N 85°28′12″E
- Elevation: 341 metres (1,119 ft)
- System: Indian Railways junction station
- Owner: Indian Railways
- Operator: East Central Railways
- Lines: Barkakana–Son Nagar line Barkakana–Netaji S.C.Bose Gomoh line Barkakana–Muri–Chandil line Koderma–Hazaribagh–Barkakana–Ranchi line
- Platforms: 6
- Tracks: 11

Construction
- Structure type: At Ground
- Parking: Available
- Accessible: Available

Other information
- Status: Functional
- Station code: BRKA
- Zone(s): East Central Railway zone
- Division(s): Dhanbad

History
- Opened: 1927
- Electrified: 1996–97
- Former names: Central India Coalfields Railway; East Indian Railway
Location
- Location within Jharkhand Location within India

Barkakana Junction railway station (station code: BRKA), serves Barkakana and the surrounding coal mining areas in Ramgarh district in the Indian state of Jharkhand. It comes under Dhanbad Division of East Central Railway zone.

== History ==
In 1927, the Central India Coalfields Railway opened the Gomoh–Barkakana line. It was extended to Daltonganj in 1929. Later, these lines were amalgamated with East Indian Railway. In the same year (1927), Bengal Nagpur Railway opened the 116-kilometre (72 mi) Muri–Barkakana section to traffic. The 57 km-long Hazaribagh–Barkakana section was opened for passenger trains on 7 December 2016 by Railway Minister Suresh Prabhu in the presence of Chief Minister Raghubar Das

== Electrification ==
Barkakana–Garhwa, Barkakana–Danea and Barkakana–Ramgarh sections were electrified in 1996–97.

== Rating ==
- Overall 3.8/5
- cleanliness - good (8)/10
- porters/escalators - average (7)/10
- food - average (7)/10
- transportation - good (8)/10
- lodging - average (5)/10
- safety - good (6)/10

== Trains ==
No. of Originating trains- 9

- Patna–Ranchi Vande Bharat Express
- Tatanagar–Patna Vande Bharat Express (one day in a week)
- Ranchi–New Delhi Garib Rath Express
- Dhanbad-Lokmanya Tilak Terminus Express Special
- Jharkhand Swarna Jayanti Express (via Barkakana)
- Lokmanya Tilak Terminus–Gaya Weekly Superfast Express
- Visakhapatnam–Banaras Express
- Ranchi–Varanasi Express
- Ranchi–Chopan Express
- Shaktipunj Express
- Tatanagar–Jammu Tawi Express
- Sambalpur–Jammu Tawi Express
- Palamu Express
- Howrah–Bhopal Weekly Express
- Santragachi–Ajmer Weekly Express
- Kolkata–Madar Express (Weekly Express)
- Ahmedabad–Kolkata Express (Weekly express)
- Asansol - Hatia Express

And many more express, passenger and intercity train run through this station.

== Nearest airports ==
- Birsa Munda Airport (53 Km)
- Bokaro Airport (85 Km)
- Dhanbad Airport (130 Km)
- Sonari Airport (167 Km)

Preceding station	Indian Railways	Following station
Ramgarh Cantt towards ?	South Eastern Railway zone Muri–Barkakana line	Terminus
Argada towards ?	East Central Railway zone Gomoh–Barkakana line	Terminus
Argada towards ?	East Central Railway zone Barkakana–Koderma section via Hazaribagh	Terminus
Sidhwar towards ?	East Central Railway zone Barkakana–Ranchi section	Terminus
Bhurkunda towards ?	East Central Railway zone Barkakana Sonnagar and Singrauli line	Terminus
