= Dhanbad–Alappuzha Express =

Train in India

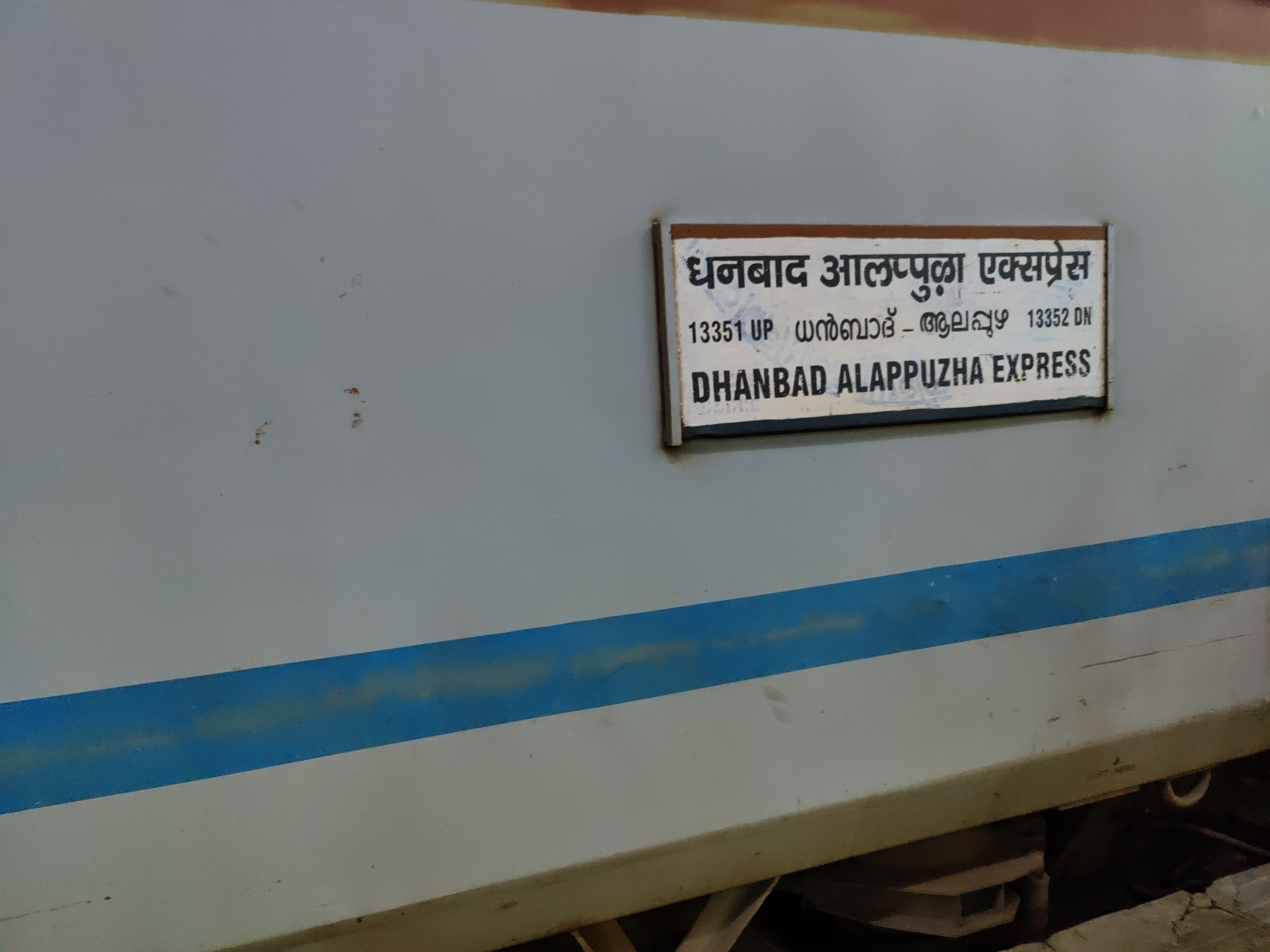
- Dhanbad-Alappuzha Express train board.

Overview
- Service type: Express
- Locale: Kerala, Tamil Nadu, Andhra Pradesh, Odisha & Jharkhand
- First service: 1 April 1966; 60 years ago
- Current operator: East Central Railway

Route
- Termini: Dhanbad (DHN); Alappuzha (ALLP)
- Stops: 85
- Distance travelled: 2,530 km (1,572 mi)
- Average journey time: 51 hrs 40 mins
- Service frequency: Daily (Note: Runs seven days in a week for every direction.)
- Train number: 13351 / 13352

On-board services
- Classes: AC First Class, AC 2 Tier, AC 3 Tier, Sleeper Class, General Unreserved
- Seating arrangements: Yes
- Sleeping arrangements: Yes
- Catering facilities: On-board catering E-catering; Pantry Car
- Observation facilities: Large windows
- Baggage facilities: Available
- Other facilities: Below the seats

Technical
- Rolling stock: LHB coach
- Track gauge: 1,676 mm (5 ft 6 in)
- Operating speed: 49 km/h (30 mph) average including halts.
Route map
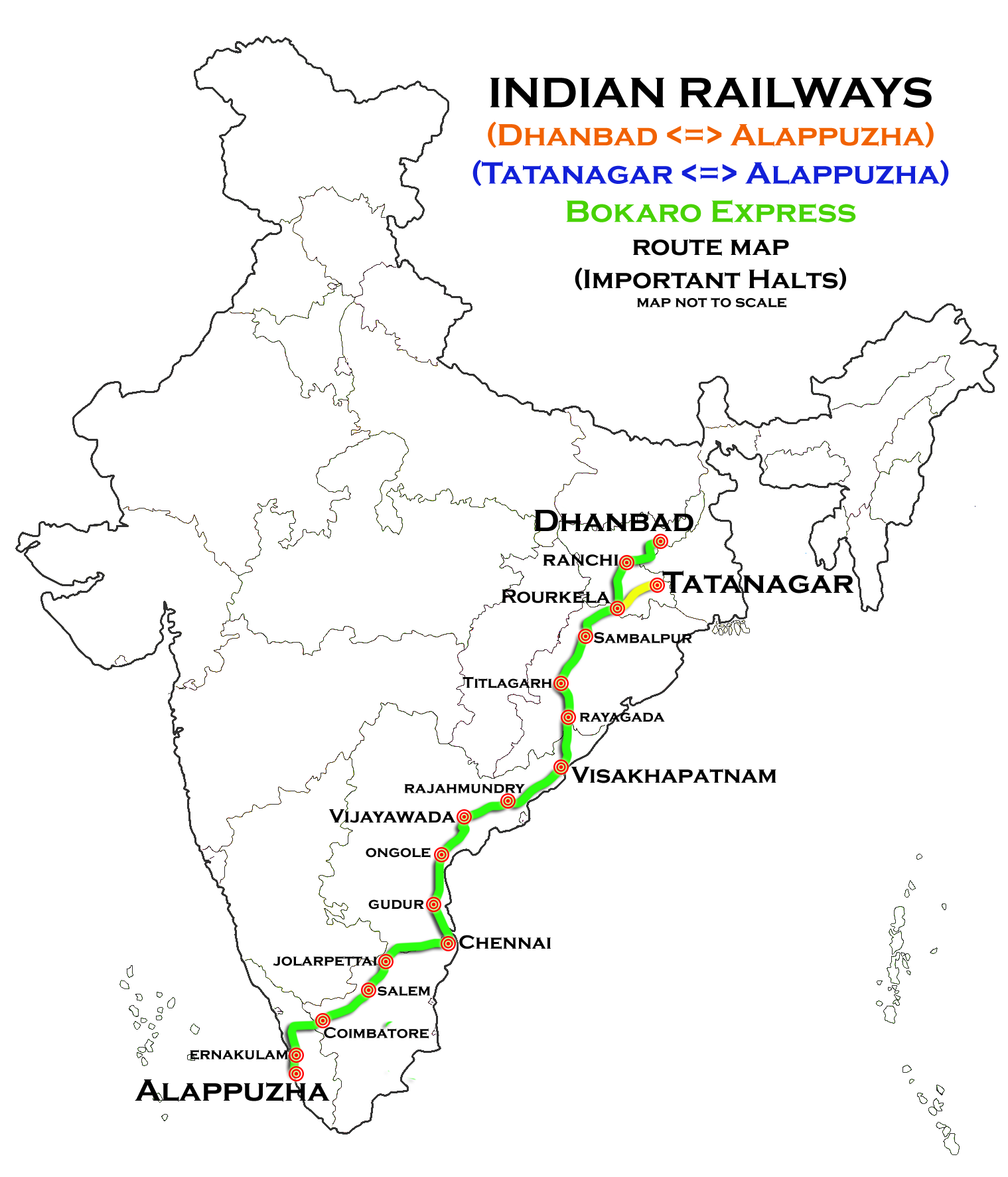

The 13351 / 13352 Dhanbad–Alappuzha Express is an express train belonging to East Central Railway zone that runs between Dhanbad Junction and Alappuzha in India. It is currently being operated with 13351/13352 train numbers on a daily basis, earlier it runs between Bokaro and Chennai so it was named as Bokaro-Madrass express .

== Service ==
The 13351/Dhanbad–Alappuzha Express has an average speed of 45 km/h and covers 2546 km in 57h. The 13352/Alappuzha–Dhanbad Express has an average speed of 46 km/h and covers 2546 km in 55h 30m. From April first 2019 the train will not touch Shornur Junction, pass through link line and will halt at Ottappalam and Wadakkanchery in both directions.

== History of the Train ==
The train was originally introduced in 1970 as the TATA–Madras service. In 1975, it was extended up to Bokaro. Later, in 1981, the service was reorganised into two separate trains — the TATA–Madras and a new Bokaro–Madras service via Ranchi, with both trains operating in coordination up to Rourkela.

During the 1991–92 Railway Budget, the TATA / Bokaro–Madras service was further extended up to Alappuzha (ALLP). Subsequently, in the 2003–04 Railway Budget, approval was granted to extend the Bokaro–Alappuzha service up to Dhanbad, thereby enhancing connectivity to the coalfield region.

The extension of the train up to Dhanbad was primarily undertaken due to maintenance and operational constraints, as Bokaro faced limitations in providing adequate maintenance facilities for the rake.

In the post-COVID operational period, rake linking with the Tatanagar–Alappuzha Express was discontinued, following which both services began operating independently in terms of scheduling and rake management.

== Route and halts ==
The important halts of the train are:

- Dhanbad Junction
- Katrasgarh
- Chandrapura Junction
- Bokaro Steel City
- Kotshila Junction
- Jhalida
- Muri Junction
- Ranchi Junction
- Hatia
- Govindpur Road
- Bano
- Nuagaon
- Bondamunda
- Rourkela Junction
- Rajgangpur
- Bamra
- Jharsuguda Junction
- Rengali
- Sambalpur Junction
- Attabira
- Bargarh Road
- Barpali
- Balangir junction
- Titlagarh Junction
- Kesinga
- Muniguda
- Rayagada
- Parvathipuram Town
- Parvathipuram
- Bobbili Junction
- Vizianagaram Junction
- Kottavalasa Junction
- Somhachalam
- Visakhapatnam Junction
- Duvvada
- Anakapalle
- Elamanchili
- Narsipatnam Road
- Tuni
- Annavaram
- Pithapuram
- Samarlkota Junction
- Anaparti
- Dwarapudi
- Rajahmundry
- Nidadavolu Junction
- Tadepalligudem
- Eluru
- Vijayawada Junction
- Tenali Junction
- Nidubrolu
- Bapatla
- Chirala
- Ongole
- Singarayakonda
- Kavali
- Nellore
- Nayudupeta
- Sullurupeta
- MGR Chennai Central
- Tiruvallur
- Arakkonam Junction
- Katpadi Junction
- Jolapettai
- Tirupattur Junction
- Samalpatti
- Bommidi
- Salem Junction
- Erode Junction
- Tiruppur
- Coimbatore Junction
- Palakkad Junction
- Ottappalam
- Wadakancheri
- Thrissur
- Aluva
- Ernakulam Junction
- Turavur
- Cherthala
- Mararikulam
- Alappuzha

== Coach composition ==
The train has standard LHB rakes with max speed of 130 kmph. The train consists of 22 coaches. It consist one 1st AC, two 2nd AC, six 3rd AC, six Sleeper, four General second class, two SLRD/EOG & one Pantry Car Coach.

== Direction reversal ==
The train reverses its direction two times:

- Visakhapatnam Junction
- Chennai Central

== Rakes ==
The train has six dedicated rakes. It ran as link train with 18189/18190 Tatanagar–Alappuzha Express but was discontinued when Indian Railways started phasing out link services.

== See also ==
- Alappuzha railway station
- Dhanbad Junction railway station
- Dibrugarh–Kanyakumari Vivek Express
- Ernakulam–Patna Express (via Chennai)
- Ernakulam–Patna Express (via Tirupati)
