= Barkakana–Netaji S.C.Bose Gomoh line =

Railway line in India

Barkakana-Netaji S.C.Bose Gomoh line
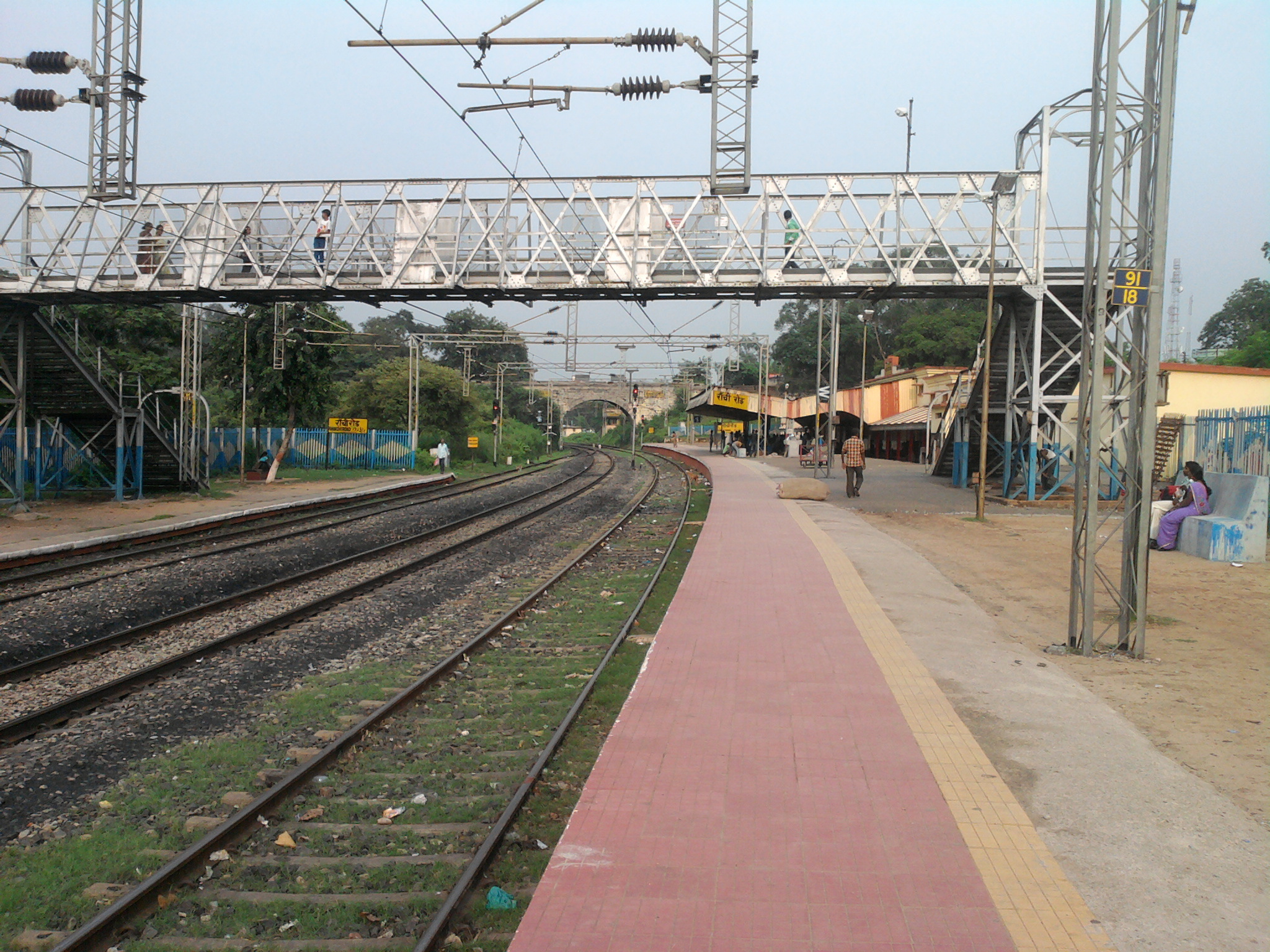
- Ranchi Road, an important railway station on Barkakana–Netaji S.C.Bose Gomoh line

Overview
- Status: Operational
- Owner: Indian Railways
- Locale: Jharkhand
- Termini: N.S.C.Bose Gomoh; Barkakana Junction
- Stations: 20

Service
- System: Electrified
- Operator: East Central Railway

History
- Opened: 1902

Technical
- Line length: 105 km (65 mi)
- Number of tracks: 2
- Track gauge: 5 ft 6 in (1,676 mm) broad gauge
- Operating speed: up to 100 km/h

The Barkakana–Netaji S.C.Bose Gomoh line is a railway line connecting Barkakana and Gomoh in India. This 105-kilometre long (65 mi) track is under the jurisdiction of East Central Railway. The section links to South Eastern Railway through Bokaro Steel City and Adra.

== History ==
Once the rail link from Howrah to Delhi was completed in 1866, the East Indian Railway was making constant endeavour to reduce the distance of the Howrah–Delhi main line. After several surveys, one in 1888–89 and two more subsequently, a route was determined from Dhanbad to Mughal Sarai via Koderma and Gaya. The major works in this section were a bridge across the Son River at Dehri, and tunnelling and ghat line construction between Gurpa and Gujhandi.

The Bengal Nagpur Railway system was connected to the East Indian Railway Company lines in 1889, thus connecting Asansol to Adra. In 1907 Adra was connected to the Grand Chord at Gomoh.

The construction of the 143-kilometre-long (89 mi) Chandrapura–Muri–Ranchi–Hatia line started in 1957 and was completed in 1961.

In 1902, a branch line of EIR was opened from Sone East Bank (later renamed Son Nagar) to Daltonganj. With the development of South Karanpura Coalfield, the Central India Coalfields Railway opened a line from Gomoh to Barkakana in 1927 and from Barkakana to Daltonganj in 1929. These lines were subsequently taken over by EIR.

== Electrification ==
Electrification of the stretch of mainline of this section from Asansol to Netaji SC Bose Gomoh was completed in 1960–61. Electrification of the stretch from Netaji SC Bose Gomoh to Gaya was completed in 1961–62.

On the Gomoh–Barkakana line electrification was done from both ends: Gomoh to Phusro in 1986–87, Barkakana to Danea in 1996–97, Danea to Gomia and Gomia to Jarandih in 1997–98.

== Loco sheds ==
Netaji SC Bose Gomoh has an electric loco shed with capacity to hold 125+ locos. Locos housed at the shed include WAG-7, WAG-9, WAG-9I, WAP-7. WAP-7 locos serve the prestigious Howrah Rajdhani Express.

Bokaro Steel City has a diesel loco shed with WDM-2 and WDM-3A locos. It has a large yard for Bokaro Steel Plant.

== Railway reorganisation ==
In 1952, Eastern Railway, Northern Railway and North Eastern Railway were formed. Eastern Railway was formed with a portion of East Indian Railway Company, east of Mughalsarai and Bengal Nagpur Railway. Northern Railway was formed with a portion of East Indian Railway Company west of Mughalsarai, Jodhpur Railway, Bikaner Railway and Eastern Punjab Railway. North Eastern Railway was formed with Oudh and Tirhut Railway, Assam Railway and a portion of Bombay, Baroda and Central India Railway. East Central Railway was created in 1996–97.

== Trains ==
- Shaktipunj Express
- Howrah-Bhopal Weekly Express
- Ahmedabad-Kolkata Express
- Kolkata-Madar Express
- Gomoh-Chopan Passenger
- Gomoh-Barwadih Passenger
- Asansol-Barkakana MEMU
