= Singrauli–Patna Express =

Train in India

Overview
- Service type: Express
- Locale: Madhya Pradesh, Uttar Pradesh & Bihar
- Current operator: East Central Railway

Route
- Termini: Singrauli (SGRL); Patna Junction (PNBE)
- Stops: 21
- Distance travelled: 478 km (297 mi)
- Average journey time: 12 hours 35 minutes
- Service frequency: Daily (Note: Runs seven days in a week for every direction.)
- Train number: 13349 / 13350

On-board services
- Classes: AC 2 Tier, AC 3 Tier, Sleeper Class, General Unreserved
- Seating arrangements: Yes
- Sleeping arrangements: Yes
- Catering facilities: E-catering only
- Observation facilities: ICF coach
- Baggage facilities: No
- Other facilities: Below the seats

Technical
- Rolling stock: LHB coach
- Track gauge: 1,676 mm (5 ft 6 in)
- Operating speed: 38 km/h (24 mph) average including halts.

The 13349 / 13350 Singrauli–Patna Express is an Express train belonging to East Central Railway zone that runs between Singrauli and Patna Junction in India. It is currently being operated with 13349/13350 train numbers on a daily basis.

== Service ==
The 23347/Singrauli–Patna Express has an average speed of 36 km/h and covers 469 km in 13h 10m. The 23348/Patna–Singrauli Express has an average speed of 36 km/h and covers 469 km in 13h 10m.

== Route and halts ==
The important halts of the train are:

- Singrauli
- Chopan
- Renukoot
- Garhwa
- Dehri-on-Sone
- Son Nagar Junction
- Anugraha Narayan Road
- Gaya Junction
- Jehanabad
- Patna Junction

== Coach composition ==
The train has standard ICF rakes with max speed of 110 kmph. The train consists of 9 coaches:

- 1 AC III Tier
- 2 Sleeper coaches
- 5 General Unreserved
- 2 Seating cum Luggage Rake

== Traction ==
Both trains are hauled by a Patratu Loco Shed-based WDM-3A diesel locomotive from Singrauli to Chopan. From Chopan, train is hauled by a Mughal Sarai Loco Shed-based WAP-4 or WAM-4 electric locomotive to Garhwa Road, and vice versa.

== Rake sharing ==
The train was attached to 13347/13348 Palamu Express at Garhwa Road Junction earlier. But now it does not attach with Palamu Express at Garhwa Road Junction

The train shares its rake with 13347/48 Palamu Express, 13331/32 Dhanbad-Patna Intercity Express and 03249/50 Patna Rajgir Special.

Train No.	Train name	Departs	Arrival
13331	Dhanbad-Patna Intercity Express	DHN@08:05 AM Daily	PNBE@05:30 PM Daily
13350	Patna-Singrauli Express	PNBE@07:15 AM Daily	SGRL@07:00 AM Daily
13349	Singrauli-Patna Express	SGRL@08:15 PM Daily	PNBE@09:00 AM Daily
03250	Patna-Rajgir Special	PNBE@09:20 AM Daily	RGD@12:20 PM Daily
03249	Rajgir-Patna Special	RGD@03:10 PM Daily	PNBE@06:20 PM Daily
13348	Palamu Express	PNBE@08:20 PM Daily	BRKA@07:50 AM Daily
13347	Palamu Express	BRKA@06:30 PM Daily	PNBE@06:50 AM Daily
13332	Patna-Dhanbad Intercity Express	PNBE@08:30 AM Daily	DHN@04:50 PM Daily

== Direction reversal ==
The train reverses its direction 2 times:

- Son Nagar Junction
- Chopan

== See also ==
- Singrauli railway station
- Patna Junction railway station
