= Muri Express =

Train in India

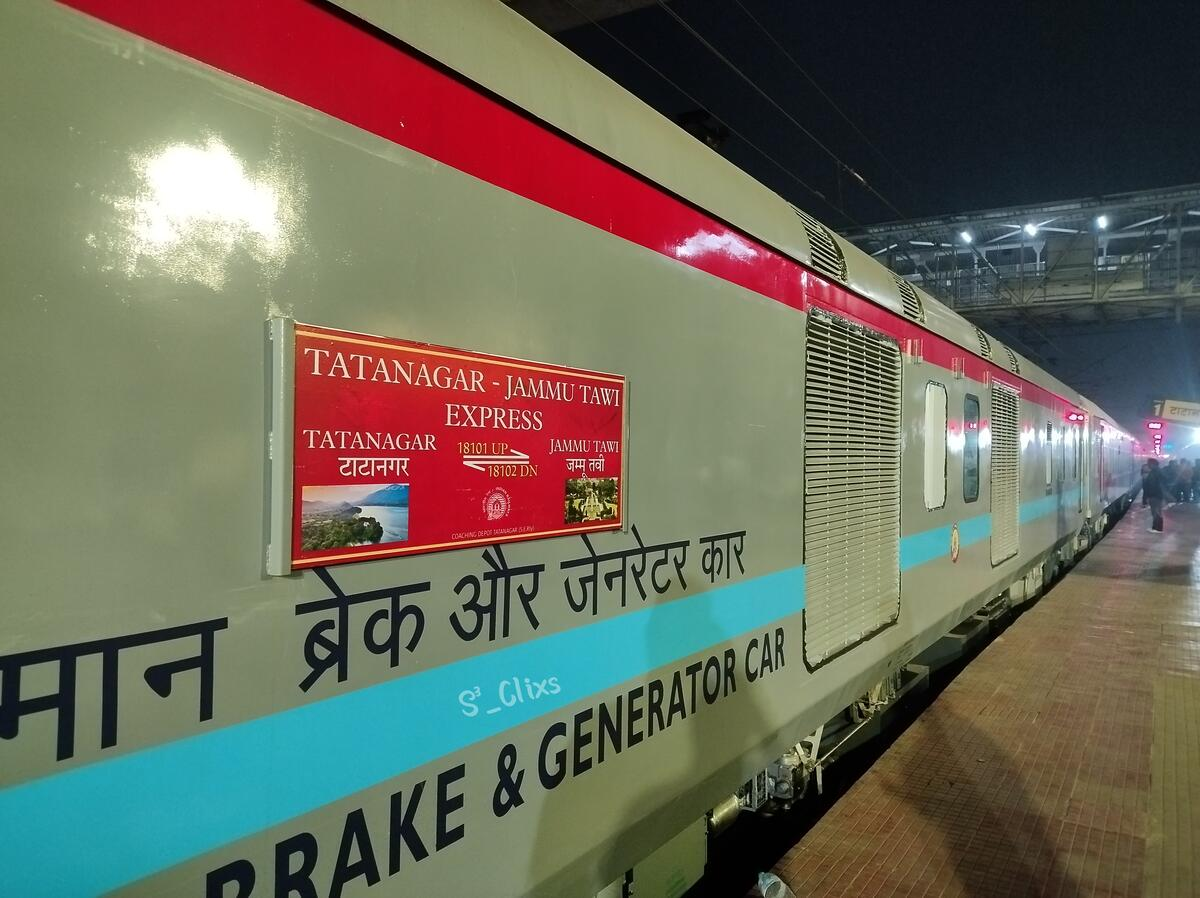
- Train board of Muri Express

Overview
- Service type: Express
- Locale: Jharkhand, Uttar Pradesh, Delhi, Haryana, Punjab & Jammu and Kashmir
- First service: 1 November 1975; 50 years ago
- Current operator: South Eastern Railway

Route
- Termini: Tatanagar (TATA); Jammu Tawi (JAT)
- Stops: 55
- Distance travelled: 2,069 km (1,286 mi)
- Average journey time: 45 hrs 20 mins
- Service frequency: Tri-Weekly
- Train number: 18101 / 18102

On-board services
- Classes: AC 2 Tier, AC 3 Tier Economy, Sleeper Class, General Unreserved
- Seating arrangements: Yes
- Sleeping arrangements: Yes
- Catering facilities: Available
- Observation facilities: Large windows
- Baggage facilities: No
- Other facilities: Below the seats

Technical
- Rolling stock: LHB coach
- Track gauge: 1,676 mm (5 ft 6 in)
- Operating speed: 46 km/h (29 mph) average including halts.

The 18101 / 18102 Muri Express is an express train belonging to Indian Railways – South Eastern Railway zone that runs between Tatanagar Junction and Jammu Tawi in India.

It operates as train number 18101 from Tatanagar Junction to Jammu Tawi and as train number 18102 in the reverse direction, serving the states of Jharkhand, Uttar Pradesh, Delhi, Haryana, Punjab and Jammu and Kashmir.

== Coaches ==
The 18101 / 02 Tatanagar–Jammu Tawi has 2 AC 2 Tier, 6 AC 3 Tier Economy, 7 Sleeper Class, 2 Unreserved/General, 1 EOG and 1 Seating cum Luggage Rake Coaches. It also carry a pantry car.

== Service ==
The 18101 Tatanagar–Jammu Tawi Express covers the distance of 2,069 km (1,286 mi) in 45 hours 5 mins (46 km/h) and in 43 hours 30 mins as 18102 Jammu Tawi–Tatanagar Express (48 km/h).

As the average speed of the train is below 55 km/h (34 mph), as per Indian Railways rules, its fare does not include a Superfast surcharge.

== Routeing ==
The 18101 / 18102 Tatanagar–Jammu Tawi Express runs from Tatanagar Junction via Chandil, Muri, Ramgarh, Barkakana, Patratu, Kahlari, Tori, Latehar, Barwadih, Daltonganj, Garwa road, Garwa, Nagar Untari, WyndhamGanj, Duddhinagr, Renukut, Chopan, Sonbhadra, Chunar, Mirzapur, Vindyachal, Meja road, Prayagraj junction, Khaga, Fatehpur, Kanpur Central, Rura, Jhinjak, Etawah, Shikoabad Junction, Tundla Junction, Aligarh Junction, Ghaziabad, Delhi Junction, Sabzi Mandi, Panipat Junction, Sonipart Junction, Karnal, Kurekshetra Junction, Shabad Markanda, Ambala Cantonment Junction, Chandigarh Junction, Ludhiana Junction, Phillaur Junction, Phagwara Junction, Jalandhar Cantonment Junction, Jalandhar City Junction, Beas Junction, Jandiala, Amritsar Junction, Batala Junction, Dhiriwal, Gurdaspur, Dinanagar, Pathankot Junction, Hiranagar, Viajaypur Jammu, to Jammu Tawi.

It reverses its direction of travel twice during its run at Amritsar Junction and Pathankot Junction.

== Traction ==
earlier was WDM-3A. As the entire route is fully electrified, a Tatanagar Loco Shed-based WAP-7 electric locomotive hauls the train from end to end in both directions.

== Slip coaches ==
The train used to get attached/detached to/from 18309/18310 Sambalpur–Jammu Tawi Express at Muri Junction to continue till Jammu Tawi. This system was in use till March 2020. Now two different rakes have been allotted to both the trains.

== Operation ==
- 18101 Tatanagar–Jammu Tawi Express runs from Tatanagar Junction on Sunday, Wednesday and Friday reaching Jammu Tawi on the 3rd day.
- 18102 Jammu Tawi–Tatanagar Junction Express runs from Jammu Tawi on Monday, Wednesday and Saturday reaching Tatanagar Junction on the 3rd day.

== 2015 derailment ==
On 25 May 2015, 8 coaches of Rourkela–Jammu Tawi Muri Express derailed near Athsari, on Mughalsarai–Kanpur section around 1:40 pm. 4 people died and 9 were injured in the accident. Both, Rail Minister Suresh Prabhu and Chief Minister of U.P. Akhilesh Yadav announced compensation to the victims of accident.
