= NXN (disambiguation) =

NXN may refer to:

- Nike Cross Nationals, an invitational cross country meet in the United States
- nxn, the ISO 639-3 code for Ngawun language
- Nuagaon railway station, the station code NXN
- NxN, a 5-piece, Night by Night's debut album
- NXN, the human protein-coding gene
