= Rengali railway station =

Railway station on the East Coast Railway network in the state of Odisha, India

Rengali

General information
- Location: Rengali, Odisha; India
- Coordinates: 21°38′13″N 84°02′33″E
- System: Indian Railways station
- Owner: Ministry of Railways, Indian Railways
- Line: Jharsuguda–Vizianagaram line
- Platforms: 2
- Tracks: 2

Construction
- Structure type: Standard (on ground)
- Parking: No

Other information
- Status: Functioning
- Station code: RGL
- Zone(s): East Coast Railway
- Division(s): Sambalpur
Location
- Location within India Location within Odisha

Rengali railway station is a railway station on the East Coast Railway network in the state of Odisha, India. It serves Rengali town. Its code is RGL. It has two platforms. Passenger, Express and Superfast trains halt at Rengali railway station.

== Major trains ==
- Dhanbad–Alappuzha Express
- Tapaswini Express
- Samaleshwari Express
- Sambalpur–Varanasi Express
- Ispat Express
- Rourkela–Gunupur Rajya Rani Express
- Rourkela–Bhubaneswar Intercity Express

== See also ==
- Sambalpur district
