= Gurdaspur railway station =

Railway station in Punjab

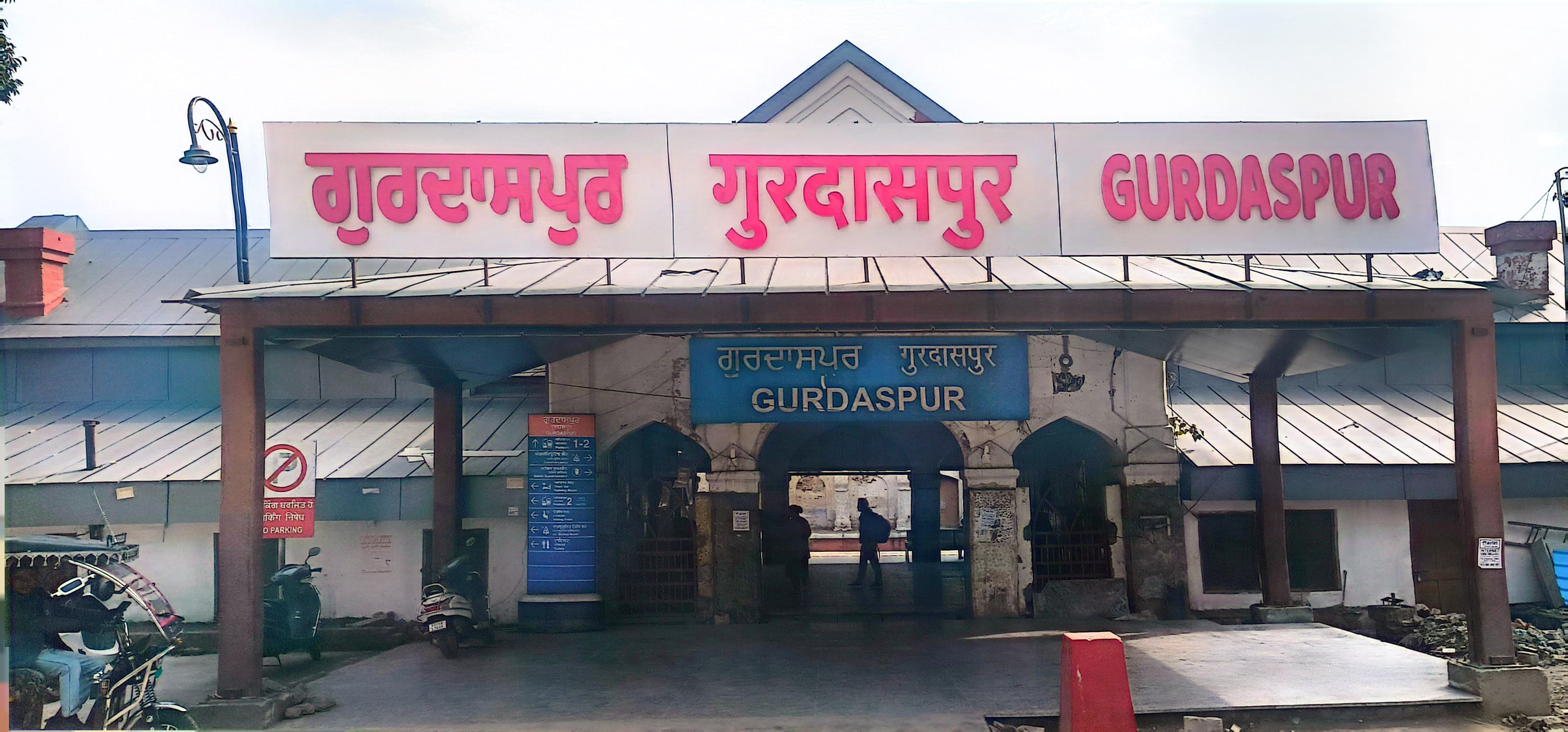

General information
- Location: Civil Lines, Gurdaspur, Punjab; India
- Coordinates: 32.0436°N 75.4199°E
- Elevation: 266 metres (873 ft)
- System: Indian Railways station
- Owner: Indian Railways
- Operator: Jammu railway division
- Line: Amritsar–Jammu main line
- Platforms: 2
- Tracks: 4
- Connections: Auto stand

Construction
- Structure type: Standard (on-ground station)
- Parking: Yes
- Cycle facilities: Yes
- Accessible: Yes

Other information
- Status: Functioning
- Station code: GSP
- Fare zone: Northern Railway

History
- Electrified: Yes (2018)
Location

Gurdaspur Railway Station is a main railway station in Gurdaspur district, Punjab. Its station code is GSP. It serves the district headquarter of Gurdaspur city. The station is located on Amritsar-Pathankot line. The station consists of two platforms, having access of F.O.B. (Foot Over Bridge). This station is being redesigned under Amrit Bharat Station Scheme of the Ministry of Railways (India). This station has many facilities like Air Conditioned waiting lounge, Executive Lounge, Washrooms, Wi-Fi etc.

Facilities available at Gurdaspur Railway Station

- Executive Lounge
- Retiring Room
- Waiting Room (with or without AC)
- Toilets

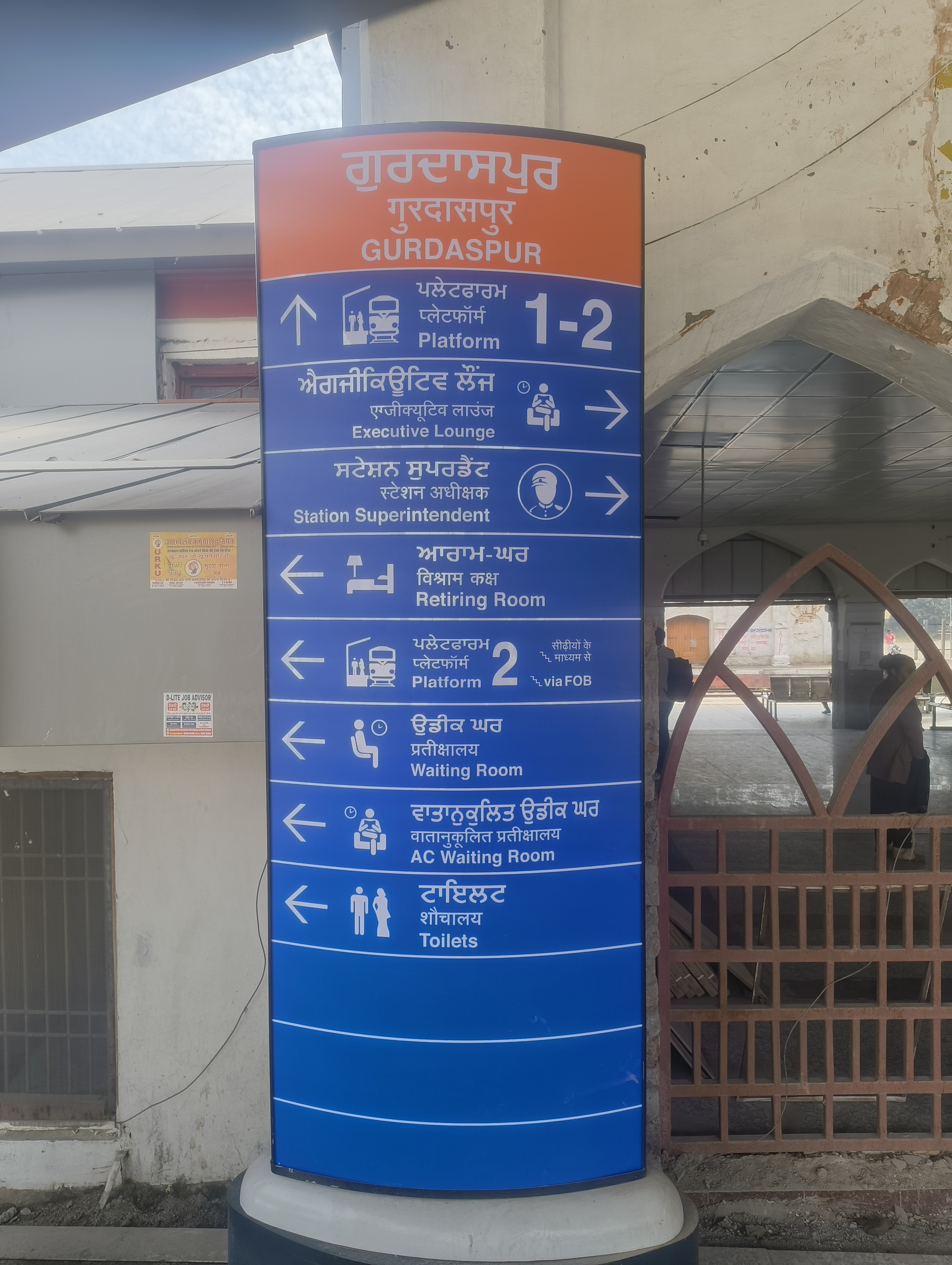
List of Amenities at Gurdaspur Railway Station

== Major trains ==
- Jammu Tawi–Bathinda Express
- Pathankot–Amritsar DMU
- Pathankot Jn–Amritsar Passenger
- Durg–Jammu Tawi Express (via Amritsar)
- Delhi–Pathankot Superfast Express
- Muri Express
- Sambalpur–Jammu Tawi Express
- Ravi Express
