= Dhanbad–Patna Intercity Express =

Train in India

Overview
- Service type: Express
- Current operator: East Central Railway

Route
- Termini: Dhanbad Junction (DHN); Patna Junction (PNBE)
- Stops: 20
- Distance travelled: 370 km (230 mi)
- Average journey time: 9 hours 25 minutes
- Service frequency: Daily
- Train number: 13331 / 13332

On-board services
- Classes: AC 2 tier, AC 3 tier, Sleeper class, General Unreserved
- Seating arrangements: No
- Sleeping arrangements: Yes
- Catering facilities: On-board catering E-catering
- Observation facilities: Large windows
- Baggage facilities: No
- Other facilities: Below the seats

Technical
- Rolling stock: LHB coach
- Track gauge: 1,676 mm (5 ft 6 in)
- Operating speed: 42 km/h (26 mph) average including halts.

The 13331 / 13332 Dhanbad–Patna Intercity Express is an Express train belonging to East Central Railway zone that runs between Dhanbad Junction and Patna Junction in India. It is currently being operated with 13331/13332 train numbers on a daily basis.

== Service ==
The 13331/Dhanbad–Patna InterCity Express has an average speed of 41 km/h and covers 370 km in 9h. The 13332/Patna–Dhanbad InterCity Express has an average speed of 47 km/h and covers 370 km in 7h 55m.

== Route and halts ==
The important halts of the train are:

- Dhanbad Junction
- Barakar
- Kulti
- Chittaranjan
- Jamtara
- Vidyasagar
- Madhupur Junction
- Jasidih Junction
- Simultala
- Jhajha
- Gidhaur
- Jamui
- Mananpur
- Kiul Junction
- Lakhisarai
- Barhiya
- Hathidah Junction
- Mokama
- Barh
- Bakhtiyarpur Junction
- Khusropur
- Patna Saheb
- Rajendra Nagar Terminal
- Patna Junction

== Coach composition ==
The train has standard ICF rakes with a maximum speed of 110 km/h. The train consists of 24 coaches:

- 1 AC First cum II Tier
- 2 AC II Tier
- 4 AC III Tier
- 9 Sleeper coaches
- 6 General
- 2 Seating cum Luggage Rake

== Traction ==
Both trains are hauled by Gomoh Loco Shed-based WAP-7 or Din Dayal Upadhyay Loco Shed-based WAP-4 electric locomotive from Patna to Dhanbad and vice versa.

== Rake sharing ==
It used to have Rake sharing with 13329/30 Ganga Damodar Express when it's was running with old ICF coach. After the introduction of LHB coach in Ganga Damodar Express on 7 November 2022, the train don't have rake sharing with 13329/30 Ganga Damodar Express. Modern LHB coaches were introduced from 10 July 2025.

As of July 2025, the train shares its rake with 13347/48 Palamu Express, 13349/50 Patna-Singrauli Express and 03249/50 Patna Rajgir Special. The maintenance work will be done at Dhanbad CDO.

Train No.	Train name	Departs	Arrival
13331	Dhanbad-Patna Intercity Express	DHN@08:05 AM Daily	PNBE@05:30 PM Daily
13350	Patna-Singrauli Express	PNBE@07:15 AM Daily	SGRL@07:00 AM Daily
13349	Singrauli-Patna Express	SGRL@08:15 PM Daily	PNBE@09:00 AM Daily
03250	Patna-Rajgir Special	PNBE@09:20 AM Daily	RGD@12:20 PM Daily
03249	Rajgir-Patna Special	RGD@03:10 PM Daily	PNBE@06:20 PM Daily
13348	Palamu Express	PNBE@08:20 PM Daily	BRKA@07:50 AM Daily
13347	Palamu Express	BRKA@06:30 PM Daily	PNBE@06:50 AM Daily
13332	Patna-Dhanbad Intercity Express	PNBE@08:30 AM Daily	DHN@04:50 PM Daily

== See also ==
- Rajendra Nagar Terminal railway station
- Dhanbad Junction railway station
- South Bihar Express
- Ganga Damodar Express
