= Ravi Express =

Express train in India

Overview
- Service type: Express
- Current operator: Northern Railway zone

Route
- Termini: Amritsar Junction (ASR); Pathankot Junction (PTK)
- Stops: 5
- Distance travelled: 107 km (66 mi)
- Average journey time: 2h 30m
- Service frequency: Daily (Note: Runs seven days in a week for every direction.)
- Train number: 14633/14634

On-board services
- Class: General Unreserved
- Seating arrangements: Yes
- Sleeping arrangements: No
- Catering facilities: No
- Observation facilities: ICF coach
- Entertainment facilities: No
- Baggage facilities: No
- Other facilities: Below the seats

Technical
- Rolling stock: 2
- Track gauge: 1,676 mm (5 ft 6 in)
- Operating speed: 43 km/h (27 mph), including halts

The Ravi Express is an Express train belonging to Northern Railway zone that runs between Pathankot Junction and Amritsar Junction in India. It is currently being operated with 14633/14634 train numbers on a daily basis.

== Service ==
The 14633/Ravi Express has an average speed of 43 km/h and covers 107 km in 2h 30m. The 14634/Ravi Express has an average speed of 43 km/h and covers 107 km in 2h 30m.

== Route and halts ==
The important halts of the train are:

- Amritsar Junction
- Verka Junction
- Batala Junction
- Dhariwal
- Gurdaspur
- Dina Nagar
- Pathankot Junction

== Coach composition ==
The train has standard ICF rakes with max speed of 110 kmph. The train consists of 7 coaches:

- 5 General
- 2 Seating cum Luggage Rake

== Traction ==
Both trains are hauled by a Ludhiana Loco Shed-based WDM-3A diesel locomotive from Pathankot to Amritsar and vice versa.

== See also ==
- Pathankot Junction railway station
- Amritsar Junction railway station
- Amritsar–Pathankot Passenger
- Amritsar–Pathankot DMU
- Verka–Pathankot DEMU
