= Bamra railway station =

Railway station in India

Bamra

General information
- Location: Bamra, Odisha; India
- Coordinates: 22°03′06″N 84°17′30″E
- System: Indian Railways station
- Owner: Ministry of Railways, Indian Railways
- Line: Tatanagar–Bilaspur section
- Platforms: 3
- Tracks: 3

Construction
- Structure type: Standard (on ground)
- Parking: No

Other information
- Status: Functioning
- Station code: BMB
- Zone(s): South Eastern Railway
- Division(s): Chakradharpur
Location
- Location within India Location within Odisha

Bamra railway station is a railway station on the South Eastern Railway network in the state of Odisha, India. It serves Bamra town. Its code is BMB. It has three platforms. Passenger, Express and Superfast trains halt at Bamra railway station.

== Major trains ==
- Shalimar–Lokmanya Tilak Terminus Express
- Dhanbad–Alappuzha Express
- Howrah–Ahmedabad Superfast Express
- Rourkela–Bhubaneswar Intercity Express
- Tapaswini Express
- Rourkela–Gunupur Rajya Rani Express
- Samaleshwari Express
- Ispat Express
- South Bihar Express
- Sambalpur–Jammu Tawi Express
- Kalinga Utkal Express

== See also ==
- Sambalpur District
