= Ganga Damodar Express =

Train in India

Overview
- Service type: Express
- First service: 29 November 1980; 45 years ago
- Current operator: East Central Railway zone
- Ridership: As an overnight train between two major hubs, it experiences heavy traffic.

Route
- Termini: Dhanbad (DHN); Patna (PNBE)
- Stops: 9
- Distance travelled: 292 km (181 mi)
- Service frequency: Daily (Note: Runs seven days in a week for every direction.)
- Train number: 13329 / 13330

On-board services
- Classes: 1st AC, 2nd AC, 3rd AC, Sleeper and General Unreserved
- Seating arrangements: Yes
- Sleeping arrangements: No
- Auto-rack arrangements: Overhead racks
- Catering facilities: E-catering only
- Observation facilities: Large windows
- Baggage facilities: No
- Other facilities: Below the seats

Technical
- Rolling stock: LHB coach
- Track gauge: 1,676 mm (5 ft 6 in)
- Operating speed: 50 km/h (31 mph), average including halts.
- Rake maintenance: Dhanbad
- Rake sharing: 13333/13334 Dumka - Patna Express

The 13329 / 13330 Ganga Damodar Express is an Express train belonging to East Central Railway zone that runs between Dhanbad Junction and Patna Junction in India. It is currently being operated with 13329/13330 train numbers on a daily basis.

== Service ==
The 13329/Ganga Damodar Express has an average speed of 48 km/h and covers 292 km in 6h 5m. The 13330/Ganga Damodar Express has an average speed of 50 km/h and covers 292 km in 5h 50m.

== Coach composition ==
The train has standard LHB rakes with a maximum speed of 130 km/h. The train consists of 22 coaches :

- 1 AC First Class
- 2 AC II Tier
- 6 AC III Tier
- 6 Sleeper
- 5 General
- 1 EOG (End of Generator)
- 1 SLR (Seating cum Luggage Rake)

== Traction ==
Both trains are hauled by a Gomoh Loco Shed or Samastipur Loco Shed-based WAP-7 electric locomotive from Patna to Dhanbad and vice versa.

== Direction reversal ==
The train reverses its direction once at:

- Gaya Junction.

== Rake sharing ==
It used to have Rake sharing with 13331/13332 Dhanbad–Patna Intercity Express when it's was running with old ICF coach. After the introduction of LHB coach, it don't have rake sharing with 13331/13332 Dhanbad–Patna Intercity Express. Modern LHB coaches were introduced from 7 November 2022.

Ministry of Railway has approved introduction of 13333/13334 Dumka-Patna Express and the service of newly approved train will start from 24 January 2024 which will have Rake Sharing with 13329/13330 Ganga Damodar Express. The maintenance work will be done at Dhanbad CDO.

| Train No. | Train name | Departs | Arrival |
|---|---|---|---|
| 13329 | Ganga Damodar Express | DHN@11:20 PM Daily | PNBE@05:15 AM Daily |
| 13334 | Patna-Dumka Express | PNBE@06:40 AM Daily | DUMK@01:30 PM Daily |
| 13333 | Dumka-Patna Express | DUMK@02:10 PM Daily | PNBE@09:00 PM Daily |
| 13330 | Ganga Damodar Express | PNBE@11:20 PM Daily | DHN@05:20 AM Daily |

== See also ==
- Rajendra Nagar Terminal railway station
- Dhanbad Junction railway station
- South Bihar Express
- Dhanbad–Patna Intercity Express
