= Shaktipunj Express =

Train in India

Overview
- Service type: Express
- Locale: Madhya Pradesh, Uttar Pradesh, Jharkhand & West Bengal
- Current operator: West Central Railway

Route
- Termini: Jabalpur (JBP); Howrah (HWH)
- Stops: 45
- Distance travelled: 1,158 km (720 mi)
- Average journey time: 24 hrs 25 mins
- Service frequency: Daily
- Train number: 11447 / 11448

On-board services
- Classes: AC First Class, AC 2 Tier, AC 3 Tier, AC 3 Tier Economy, Sleeper Class, General Unreserved
- Seating arrangements: Yes
- Sleeping arrangements: Yes
- Catering facilities: On-board catering, E-catering
- Observation facilities: Large windows
- Baggage facilities: Available
- Other facilities: Below the seats

Technical
- Rolling stock: LHB coach
- Track gauge: 1,676 mm (5 ft 6 in)
- Operating speed: 46 km/h (29 mph) average including halts.
Route map
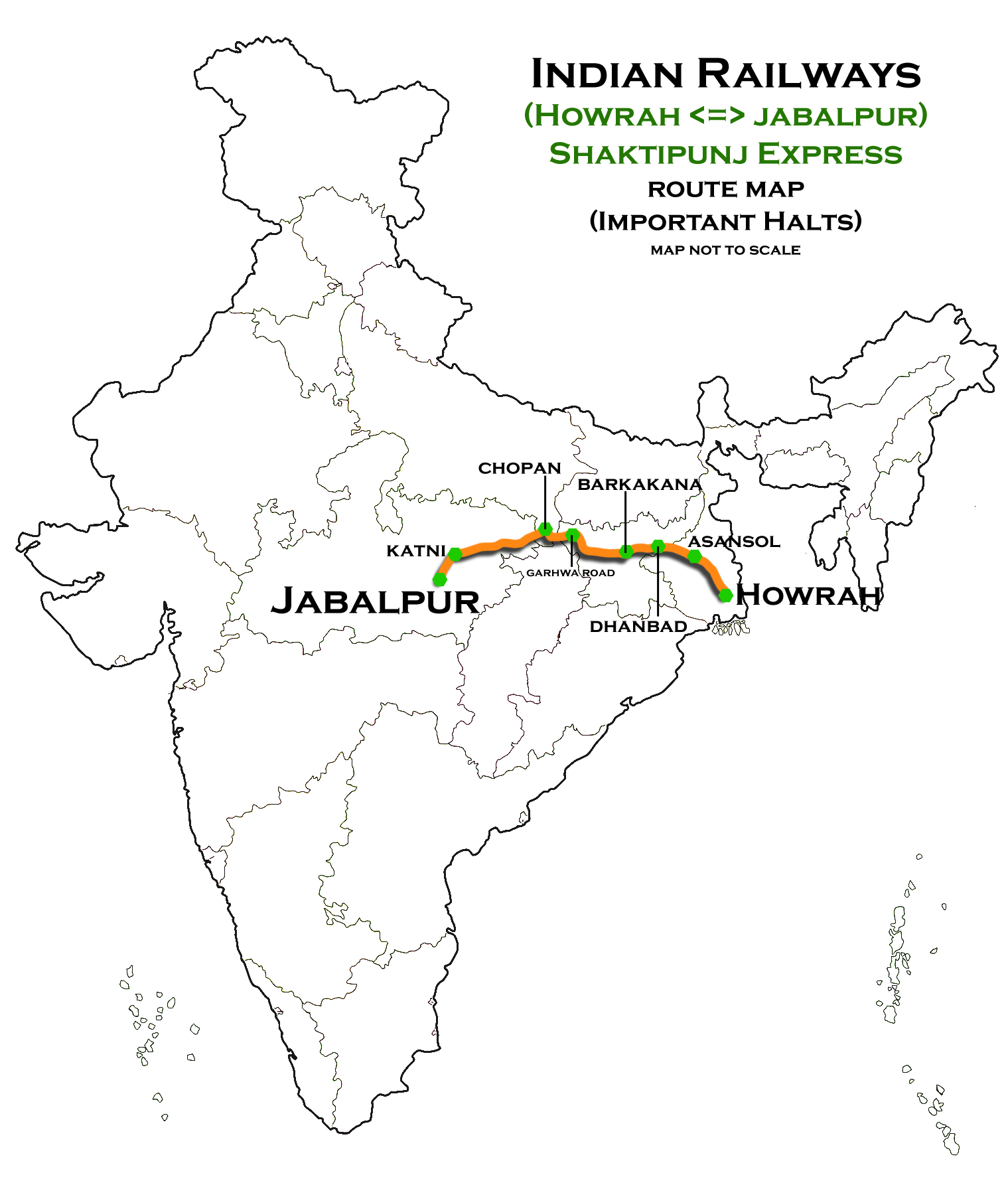

The 11447 / 11448 Shaktipunj Express is an Indian express train which runs between Jabalpur Junction railway station of Jabalpur, a major city in Madhya Pradesh, and Howrah Junction railway station of Kolkata, the capital city of West Bengal state in India. It links four states of India West Bengal, Jharkhand, Uttar Pradesh and Madhya Pradesh.

== Background ==
The name Shaktipunj may be attributed to two reasons. Firstly, initially when the train service started, it connected Shaktinagar to Howrah. Later on the route got extended up to Singrauli junction and then to Jabalpur subsequently. The name Shaktinagar inspired the name Shaktipunj. Secondly, the train passes through the important coal mining belts such as Karnpura mines (near Khalari), Ramgarh mines (near Barkakana), Singrauli, Bokaro, Dhanbad, Asansol, Raniganj etc. and many important thermal power stations like Chandrapura, Patratu, Bokaro etc. Coal is the source of energy or "Shakti".Hence the name given to this train Shaktipunj.

== Coaches ==
The 11447 / 48 Shaktipunj Express has 1 First AC, 2 AC 2 tier, 2 AC 3 tier, 3 AC 3rd Economy, 7 Sleeper Class, 4 General Unreserved, 1 SLR (Seating cum Luggage Rake) and 1 EOG (End on Generation) coaches. It does not carry a pantry car.

As is customary with most train services in India, coach composition may be amended at the discretion of Indian Railways depending on demand.

== Service ==
The 11447 Jabalpur Junction–Howrah Junction Shaktipunj Express covers the distance of 1,149 km (714 mi) in 24 hours 25 mins (46.9 km/h) and in 25 hours 10 mins as 11448 Howrah Junction–Jabalpur Junction Shaktipunj Express (45.9 km/h).

== Routeing ==
The 11447/11448 Shaktipunj Express runs from Jabalpur Junction via Katni South, Singrauli, Renukoot, Garwa Road Junction, Daltonganj, Patratu, Barkakana Junction, Dhanbad Junction, Asansol Junction, Bardhaman to Howrah Junction.

== Average and maximum speed ==
The train runs with an average speed of 46 km/h, and the maximum permissible speed is 130 km/h (between Dankuni Junction and Dhanbad Junction).

== Traction ==
It is hauled by an Itarsi Loco Shed based WAP-7 electric locomotive from Jabalpur Junction to Howrah Junction and vice versa.

== Direction reversal ==
The train reverses its direction twice:

- Chopan
- Barkakana Junction
