= Nuagaon railway station =

Railway station in India

Nuagaon

General information
- Location: Nuagaon, Odisha; India
- Coordinates: 22°23′45″N 84°56′12″E
- System: Indian Railway Station
- Owner: Ministry of Railways, Indian Railways
- Line: Tatanagar–Bilaspur section
- Platforms: 4
- Tracks: 2

Construction
- Structure type: Standard (On Ground)
- Parking: No

Other information
- Status: Functioning
- Station code: NXN
- Zone(s): South Eastern Railway
- Division(s): Chakradharpur
Location
- Location within India Location within Odisha

Nuagaon railway station is a railway station on the South Eastern Railway network in the state of Odisha, India. It serves Nuagaon village. Its code is NXN. It has four platforms. Passenger, Express trains halt at Nuagaon railway station.

== Major Trains ==
- Dhanbad - Alappuzha Express
- Visakhapatnam–Banaras Express
- Banaras-Visakhapatnam Express
- Tapaswini Express
- Rourkela-Hatia Passenger
- Hatia-Rourkela Passenger
- Podanur Special Fare Festival Special
- Barauni Special Fare Festival Special

== See also ==
- Sundergarh district
