= Cherthala railway station =

Railway station in Kerala, India

Cherthala
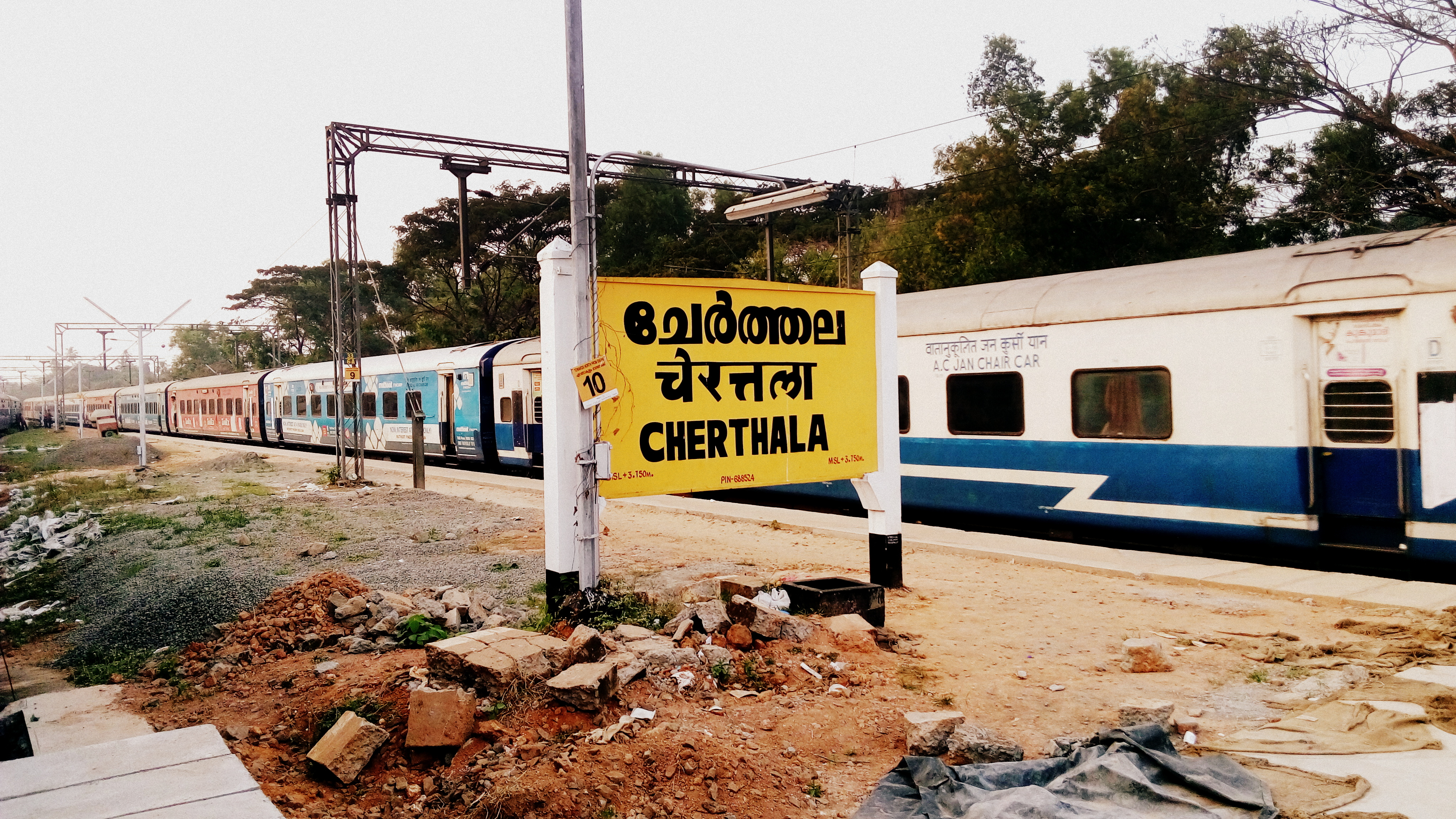
- Cherthala railway station

General information
- Location: Cherthala, Alappuzha, Kerala; India
- Coordinates: 9.69117°N 76.32565°E
- System: Regional rail, Light rail & Commuter rail station
- Owner: Indian Railways
- Operator: Southern Railway zone
- Line: Kayamkulam-Alappuzha-Ernakulam line
- Platforms: 3
- Tracks: 5

Construction
- Structure type: At–grade
- Parking: Available

Other information
- Status: Functioning
- Station code: SRTL
- Zone(s): Southern Railway zone
- Division(s): Thiruvananthapuram
- Fare zone: Indian Railways

History
- Opened: 1989; 37 years ago
Location
- Location within India Location within Kerala

Cherthala railway station (station code: SRTL) is an NSG–5 category Indian railway station in Thiruvananthapuram railway division of Southern Railway zone. It is a railway station in Alappuzha District, Kerala.
