= Daltonganj railway station =

Railway station in Jharkhand, India

Daltonganj Railway Station
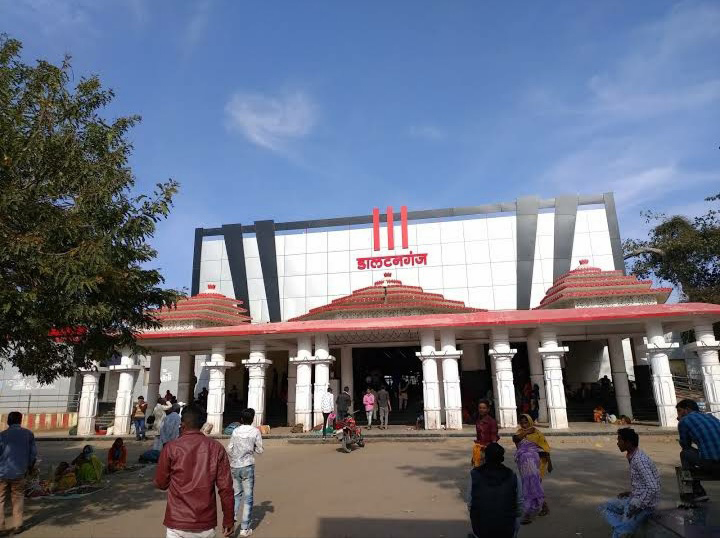
- Daltonganj railway station entry gate

General information
- Location: Medininagar, Palamu district, Jharkhand; India
- Coordinates: 24°02′00″N 86°04′28″E
- Elevation: 224.00 metres (734.91 ft)
- System: Indian Railways station
- Owner: East Central Railway
- Operator: Indian Railways
- Line: Barkakana-Son Nagar line
- Platforms: 3+1
- Tracks: 6

Construction
- Structure type: In development
- Parking: Available
- Accessible: Available

Other information
- Status: Active
- Station code: DTO
- Zone(s): East Central Railway
- Division(s): Dhanbad
- Classification: NSG‑4

History
- Electrified: Double electrified 1992
- Former names: East Indian Railway

Passengers
- 27,000 per day
Route map
Location
- Location within Jharkhand Location within India
- Interactive map

Daltonganj railway station (station code: DTO) is a railway station serving the cities of Medininagar and Palamu in Palamu district of the Indian state of Jharkhand. It is also the headquarters of the Palamu division of the East Central Railway Zone of Indian Railways. Daltonganj is a major station on the CIC route and will be a primary hub on the Ranchi–New Delhi route after the opening of the Ranchi–Tori rail line. Major trains such as the Ranchi Rajdhani Express, Muri Express, Sambalpur–Varanasi Express, Palamu Express, Ranchi–Varanasi Express, Ranchi–Ajmer Garib Nawaz Express, Triveni Express, Ahmedabad Kolkata Express, Jharkhand Swarna Jayanti Express, Jharkhand Sampark Kranti Express, and Shaktipunj Express also stop here.

Daltonganj has trains running frequently to Ranchi, Delhi, Kolkata, Varanasi, and Patna.

== History ==
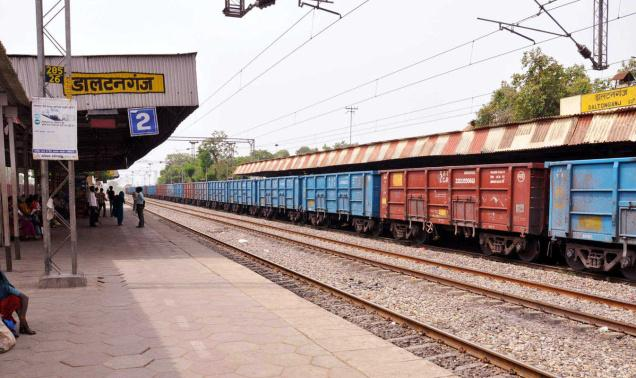
station platform no 2

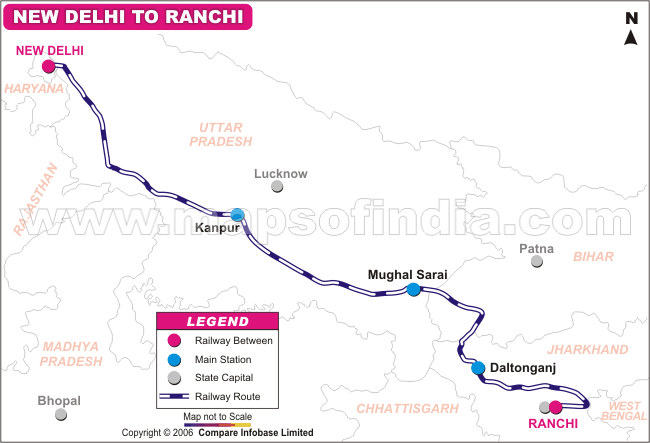
New Delhi to Ranchi via Daltonganj

In 2003, the Dhanbad division was carved out from the existing Dhanbad railway division of the Eastern Railway Zone. As of 2012, Daltonganj station is being renovated and developed in the lines of Howrah Junction. The ceilings of the Unreserved Ticketing System (UTS) and the Passenger Reservation System (PRS) are being beautified with scenery. The facade of the Daltonganj station was embellished in February 2012.

== Connections ==
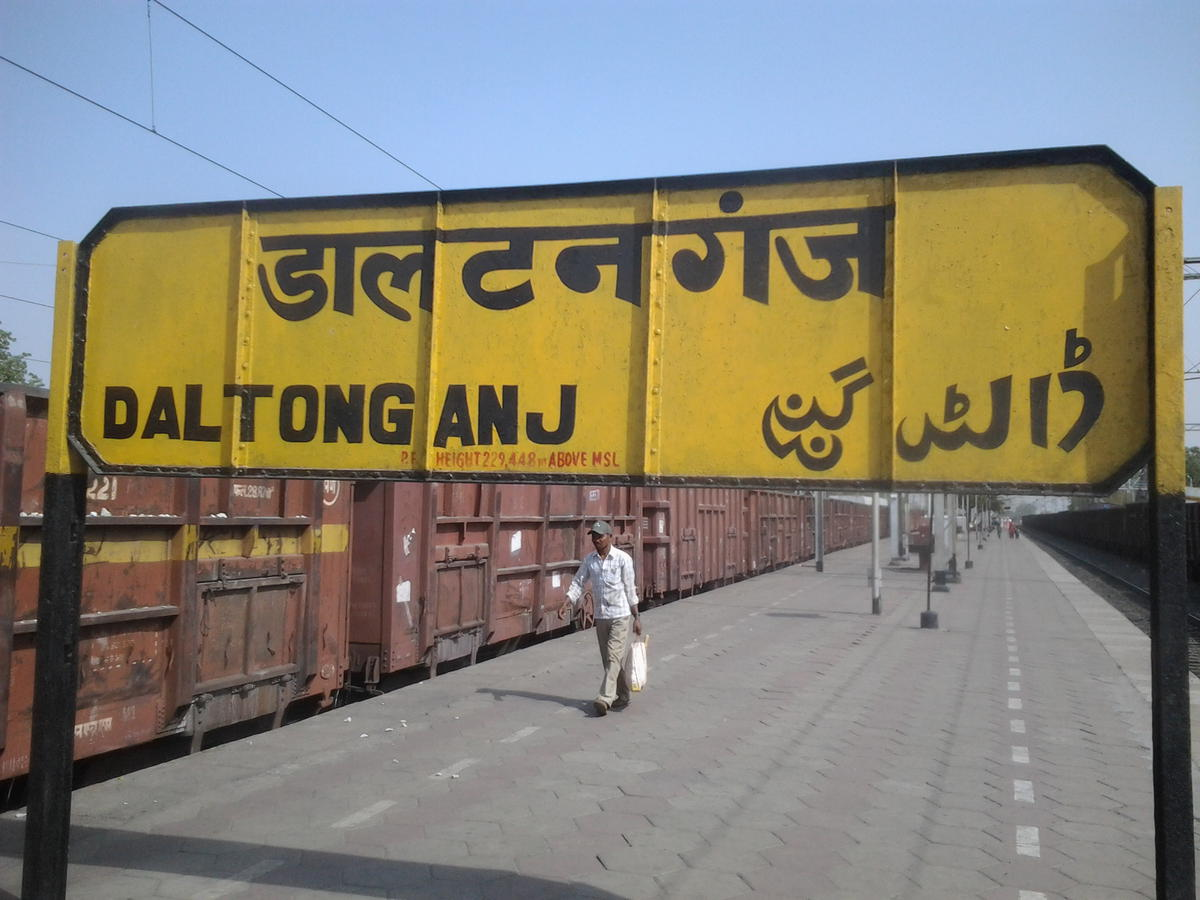
Station sign

Daltonganj station is located close to a bus terminal and a domestic airport providing transport to important destinations in Jharkhand. The nearest airports to Daltonganj station are:

1. Birsa Munda Airport, Ranchi – 168 kilometres (104 mi)
2. Gaya Airport – 181 kilometres (112 mi)
3. Lok Nayak Jayaprakash Airport, Patna – 310 kilometres (190 mi)
4. Netaji Subhash Chandra Bose International Airport, Kolkata – 575 kilometres (357 mi)

== Trains ==
Several local electric passenger trains also run from Daltonganj to neighbouring destinations at frequent intervals.

Train name	Train number	Source	Destination
Bsb Rnc Express	18612	Varanasi Junction	Ranchi
Sbp Bsb Express	18311	Ranchi	Varanasi Junction
Aii Koaa Special	03138	Ajmer Junction	Howrah Junction
Shaktipunj Express	11447	Howrah Junction	Jabalpur Junction
Shaktipunj Express	11448	Jabalpur	Howrah
Jharkhand S J E	12874	ANVT	Hatia
Jharkhand S J E	12873	Hatia	Anand Vihar Trm
RNC Garibnwaz E	18632	Ajmer	Ranchi
RNC Garibnwaz E	18631	Ranchi	Ajmer Junction
Sbp Bsb Express	18311	Sambalpur	Varanasi Junction
Tatanagar–Jammu tawi	18101	Tatanagar	Jammu Tawi
Rou Muri Jat Express	18109	Rourkela	Jammu Tawi
Tribeni Express	84369	Barwadih Junction	Bareilly
Ranchi Varanasi Exp	18611	Ranchi	Varanasi
RNC–NDLS Raj Exp	12453	Ranchi	New Delhi
RNC–NDLS G Rath Exp	12877	Ranchi	New Delhi
Palamu Express	13347	Barkakana Jn	Patna Jn
Sare Jahan Se Accha Exp	19413	Kolkata	Ahemdabad
Santragachi Ajmer Exp	18009	Santragachi	Ajmer
Ranchi Rajdhani	12454	New Delhi	Ranchi
Ranchi Chopan Exp	18613	Ranchi	Chopan

== See also ==
- Daltonganj
