= Ranchi–New Delhi Garib Rath Express =

Train in India

Ranchi Junction – New Delhi Garib Rath Express
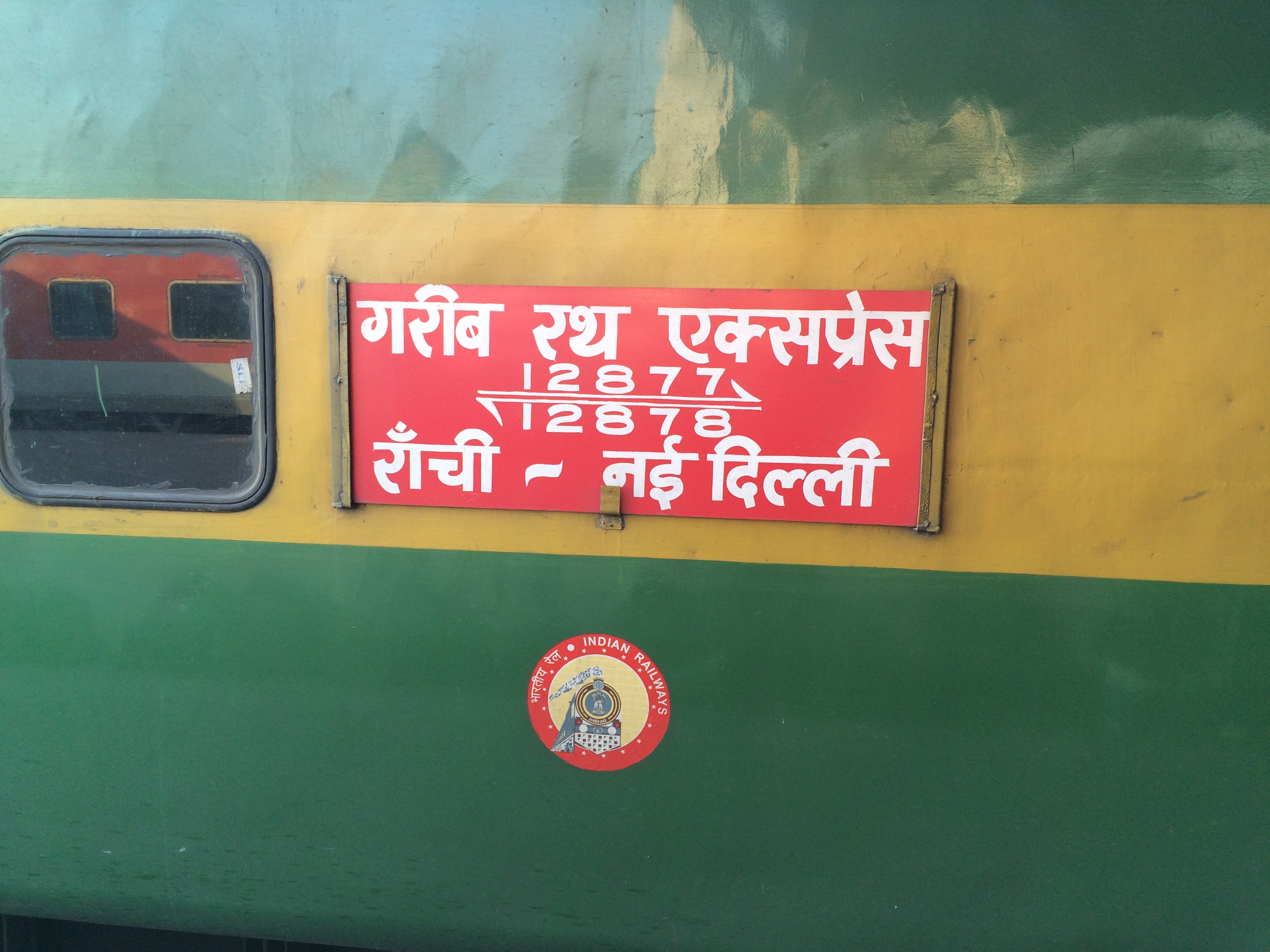
- Ranchi – New Delhi Garib Rath Express train board.

Overview
- Service type: Garib Rath Express
- Status: Triweekly Service
- First service: 31 January 2009; 17 years ago
- Current operator: South Eastern Railway

Route
- Termini: Ranchi (RNC); New Delhi (NDLS)
- Stops: 12
- Distance travelled: 1,344 km (835 mi)
- Average journey time: 18 hours 40 minutes
- Service frequency: Tri-weekly.
- Train number: 12877 / 12878

On-board services
- Class: AC 3 tier Economy
- Seating arrangements: No
- Sleeping arrangements: Yes
- Catering facilities: On-board catering, E-catering
- Observation facilities: Large windows
- Baggage facilities: Available
- Other facilities: Below the seats

Technical
- Rolling stock: LHB coach
- Track gauge: 1,676 mm (5 ft 6 in)
- Electrification: Yes
- Operating speed: 130 km/h (81 mph) maximum, 75 km/h (47 mph) average including halts.

The 12877 / 12878 Ranchi – New Delhi – Ranchi Garib Rath Express is a Superfast Express train of the Garib Rath series belonging to Indian Railways – South Eastern Railway zone that runs between Ranchi and New Delhi in India.

It operates as train number 12877 from Ranchi to New Delhi and as train number 12878 from New Delhi to Ranchi serving the states of Jharkhand, Bihar, Uttar Pradesh & Delhi.

It is part of the Garib Rath Express series launched by the former railway minister of India, Laloo Prasad Yadav.

== Route ==
The 12877 / 78 Ranchi New Delhi Garib Rath Express runs from Ranchi via Tori, Daltonganj, Sasaram Junction, Pt. Deen Dayal Upadhyaya Junction, Prayagraj Junction, Kanpur Central to New Delhi.

== Service ==
Ranchi-New Delhi Garib Rath Express (12877) operates three times a week, on Monday, Tuesday & Friday originating from Ranchi Junction, while New Delhi-Ranchi Garib Rath Express (12878) operates on Tuesday, Thursday & Saturday originating from New Delhi Railway Station. It has a travel time of approximately 19 hrs for covering 1344 km.It is the substitute of New Delhi Ranchi Rajdhani express and it runs in Rajdhani slot. since 2009 to 2024 was an end of Garib Rath Express with ICF coach now they were upgraded to LHB coach earlier they run with diesel traction WDM-3A, WDM-3D. now they hauled by WAP-4, WAP-5 and WAP-7

== Gallery ==
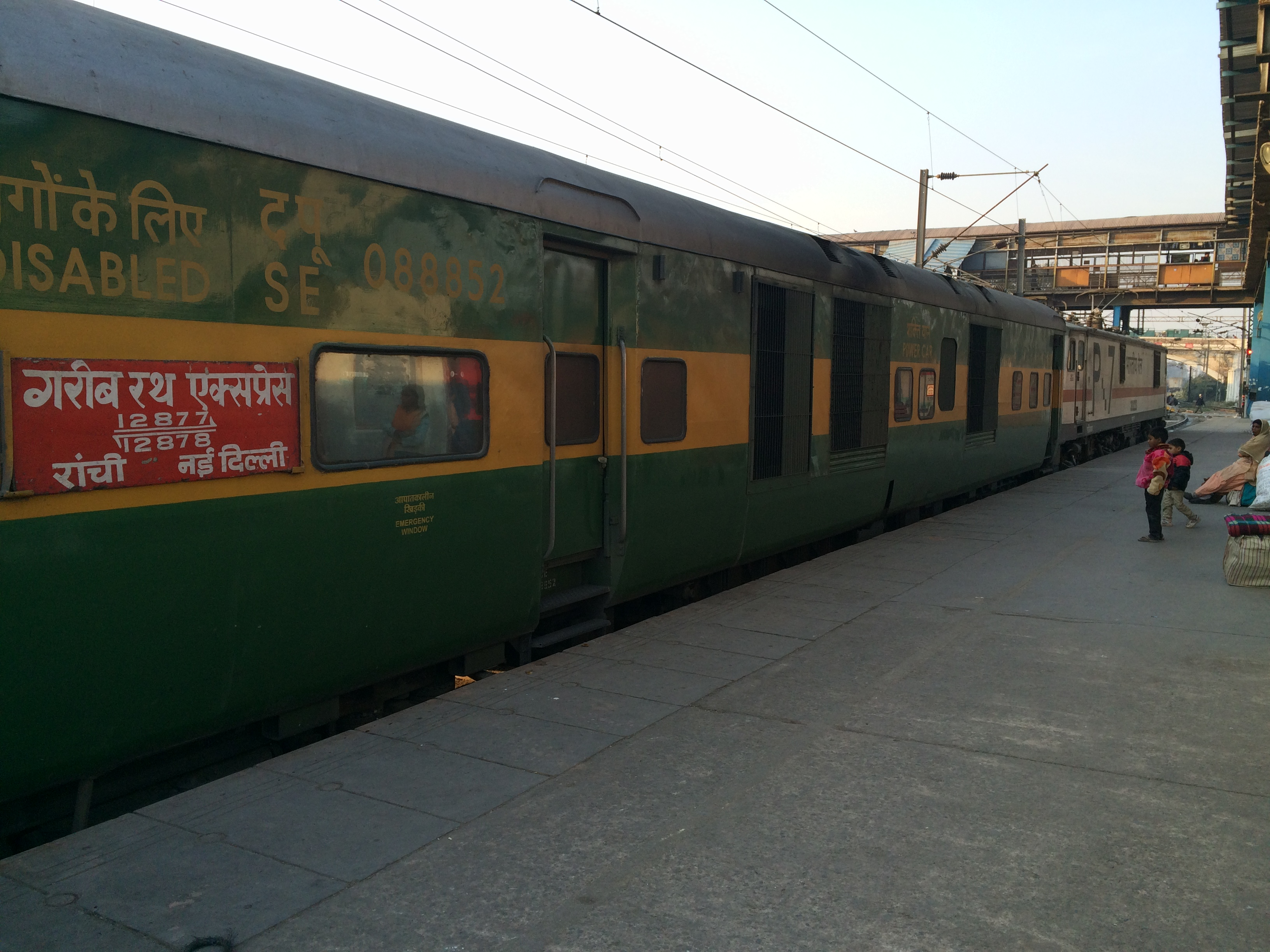
Ranchi New Delhi Garib Rath Express with a Ghaziabad based WAP 7

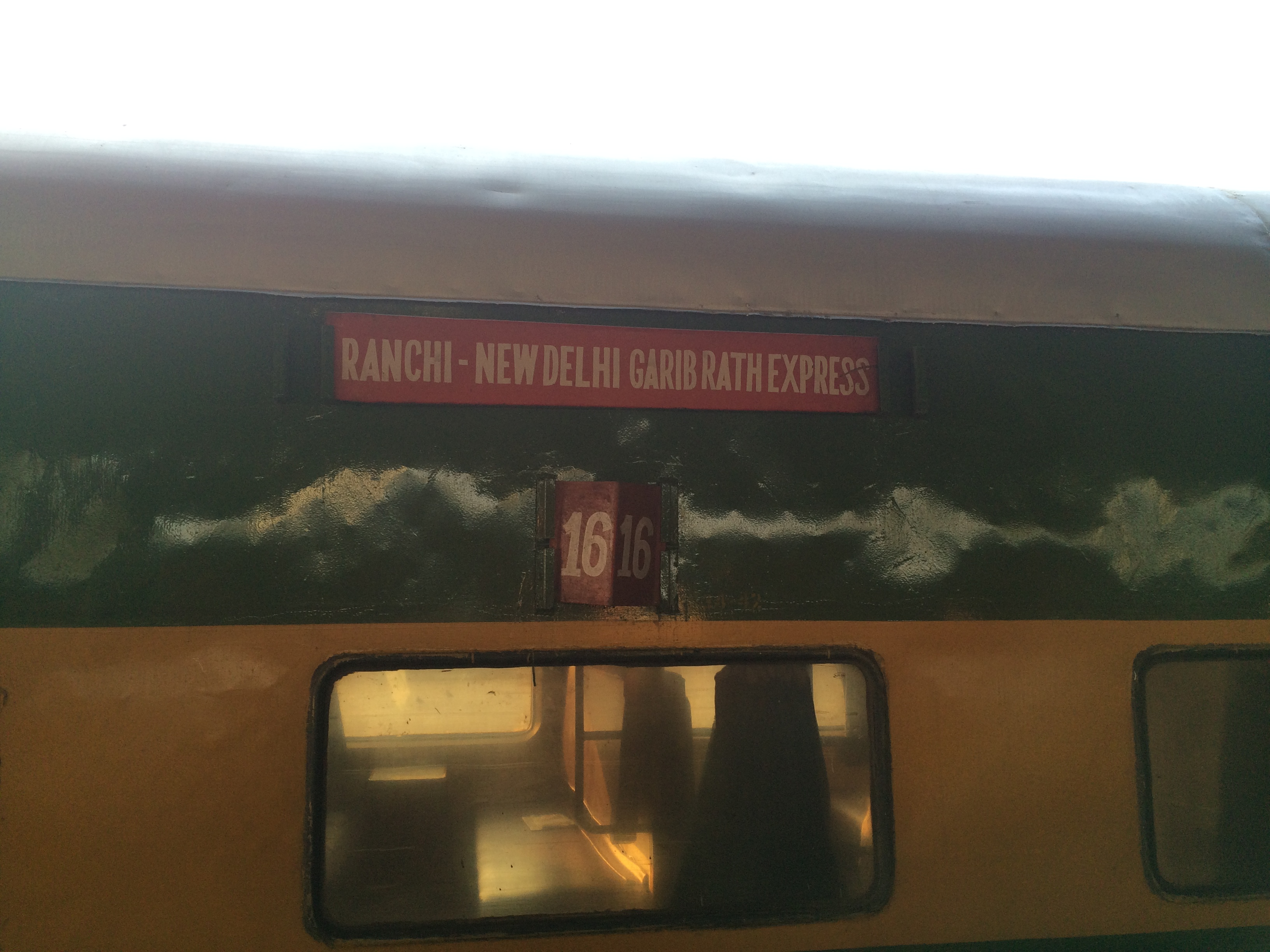
Ranchi New Delhi Garib Rath Express – 16th AC 3 tier coach
