= Barwadih =

- town
- Interactive map of Barwadih
- Location in Jharkhand, India Barwadih (India)
- Coordinates: 23.83°N 84.12°E
- Country: India
- State: Jharkhand
- District: Latehar
- Elevation: 334 m (1,096 ft)

Population (2011)
  - Total: 7,888

Languages
  - Official: Hindi
- Time zone: UTC+5:30 (IST)
- Postal code: 822111
- Vehicle registration: JH
- Website: latehar.nic.in

Barwadih is a town and Community Development Block in Latehar district of Jharkhand state in India.

== Barwadih block ==
Barwadih is a Block in Latehar District of Jharkhand State, India. Barwadih Block Headquarters is Barwadih town . It is located 47 km towards west from District headquarters Latehar. 157 km from State capital Ranchi towards East .

Barwadih Block is bounded by Chainpur Block towards North, Satbarwa Block towards East, Manika Block towards East, Daltonganj Block towards North . Daltonganj City, Garhwa City, Lohardaga City, Hussainabad City are the nearby Cities to Barwadih.

Barwadih consist of 88 Villages and 16 Panchayats. It is in the 295 m (968 ft) elevation (altitude) . This Place is in the border of the Latehar District and Palamu District. Palamu District Chainpur is North towards this place .

Betla National Park, Palamu, Latehar, Netarhat, Lohardaga are the nearby Important tourist destinations to see.

=== Railway stations ===
Barwadih Junction railway station is one of the important railway junction in Latehar District.

=== Villages ===
Barwadih, Betla, Chhencha, Chhipadohar, Chungru, Ganeshpur, Haratu, Ker, Ketchki, Khura, Kuchila, Lat, Mangra, Morwai, Kala, Pokhrikala, Ukamanr, Aghara, Akhara, Amdiha Amwatikar, Babhanddih Barawadih, Barkheta Bonchattan, Bondohare, Bore Chamaradiha, Chapari, Chatam, Chunguru, Dorami, Gari Goshedag Guwa, Harinamar, Harne Harpurwa, Hehegara Hendehas Horilong, Hosir, Hutar, Cohary, Jurgarh, Juruhar, Kachanpur, Kalayanpur, Kalpurwa, Karadih, Kechaki, Khami Khas, Kuku, Kushha, Bathan Kutamu, Labhar, Ladi, Lanka, Ledgani Luhur, Lukum, Khar, Mandal Mangara Mantu, Meral, Morwai, Khurd Mundu, Murgidih, Murmu, Nawadih Nawar, Nagu, Opag, Paira, Patradih, Pokhari, Kala, Pokhari, Khurd, Putwa, Garn, Rabdh, Ramandag, Saidup, Sarandih, Selari, Tanr, Serandag, Sindhorwa, Sukulkatha, Tanwai, Tatha, Togri, Ukumari, Grwathand, Addarsh Nagar, bich basti Haratu, Rajesh Gupta Haratu

=== Demographics ===
Hindi is the Local Language here. Total population of Barwadih Block is 78,515 living in 14,590 Houses, Spread across total 88 villages and 16 panchayats. Males are 40,619 and Females are 37,896 Total 7,218 persons lives in town and 71,297 lives in Rural.

=== Climate ===
It is Hot in summer. Barwadih summer highest day temperature is in between 24 °C to 45 °C . Average temperatures of January is 16 °C, February is 20 °C, March is 25 °C, April is 30 °C, May is 35 °C .

== Geography ==
Barwadih is located at 23.83°N 84.12°E. It has an average elevation of 334 metres (1095 feet). Betla National Park is situated 8 km from Barwadih.

== Demographics ==
As of 2011 India census, Barwadih had a population of 7888. Males constitute 4160 of the population and females 3728. Barwadih has an average literacy rate of 5646; with 3226 of the males and 2420 of females literate. 1109 of the population is under 6 years of age.

== Education ==
=== Schools ===
- St. Claret School, Barwadih
- Government. Boys High School, Barwadih
- Bal Shiksha Niketan, Barwadih
- Government. Boys High School,
- Kasturba Gandhi Balika Vidyalaya, Barwadih
- Kanya Madhya Vidyalya, Barwadih
- Middle School, Barwadih
- Shanti Niketan Residential High School
- Railway School, Barwadih
- St. Soldier Public School, Barwadih
- Project Girl's High School, Barwadih
- St. Thomas School, Barwadih
- SARASWATI SHISHU VIDYA MANDIR
- R.K MIDDLE SCHOOL HUTAR COLLIER
- UPG +2 HIGH SCHOOL SARAIDIH, BARWADIH

=== Colleges ===
1- Rajkiya krit +2 High School Barwadih

2- RMR College Barwadih

== Healthcare ==
=== Hospitals ===
- Railway Hospital Barwadih
- Gandhiji Health Care Home Barwadih
- Surya Hospital Barwadih
- State Government Hospital Barwadih

== Temples, Church, Mosque ==
=== Temples ===
- Pahadi Shiv Mandir
- Lord Hanuman Mandir
- Panchmukhi Shiv Mandir
- Maa Kaali Mandir
- Shiv mandir

=== Church ===
- Church of North India
- Catholic Church

=== Mosque ===
- Mosque of Barwadih

== Governmental offices ==
- Block of Barwadih
- Forest Department Barwadih
- Post-office Barwadih
- Police station barwadih

=== Bank ===
- State Bank of India Barwadih
- Gramin Bank

== Railway department ==
- PWI Department
- IOW Department
- Signal Department
- ROH Shed
- Power House

== Organisations ==
- Apna Adhikar Apna Samman Manch
- Akhil Bhartiya Vidyarthi Parishad

== NGOs ==
- Jagriti Gram Utthan Sansthan
- Abhinav Vikas Seva Samiti
- Pahal Jan Vikas

== Tourist attractions ==
- Betla National Park
- Netarhat
- Pahadi Shiv Mandir
- Lord Hanuman Mandir

Barwadih Railway Station, Railway Sport Culb, High School Field, Garwathand Field, & Other
