= Muniguda railway station =

Railway station in Odisha, India

Muniguda

General information
- Location: Muniguda, Odisha; India
- Coordinates: 19°37′37″N 83°29′19″E
- System: Indian Railways station
- Owner: Ministry of Railways, Indian Railways
- Lines: Raipur–Vizianagaram line Jharsuguda–Vizianagaram line
- Platforms: 3
- Tracks: 3

Construction
- Structure type: Standard (on ground)
- Parking: No

Other information
- Status: Functioning
- Station code: MNGD
- Zone(s): East Coast Railway
- Division(s): Sambalpur
Location
- Location within India Location within Odisha

Muniguda railway station is a railway station on the East Coast Railway network in the state of Odisha, India. It serves Muniguda town. Its code is MNGD. It has three platforms. Passenger, Express and Superfast trains halt at Muniguda railway station.

== See also ==
- Rayagada district
