= Ahmedabad–Kolkata Express =

Train in India

Kolkata-Ahmedabad Weekly Express
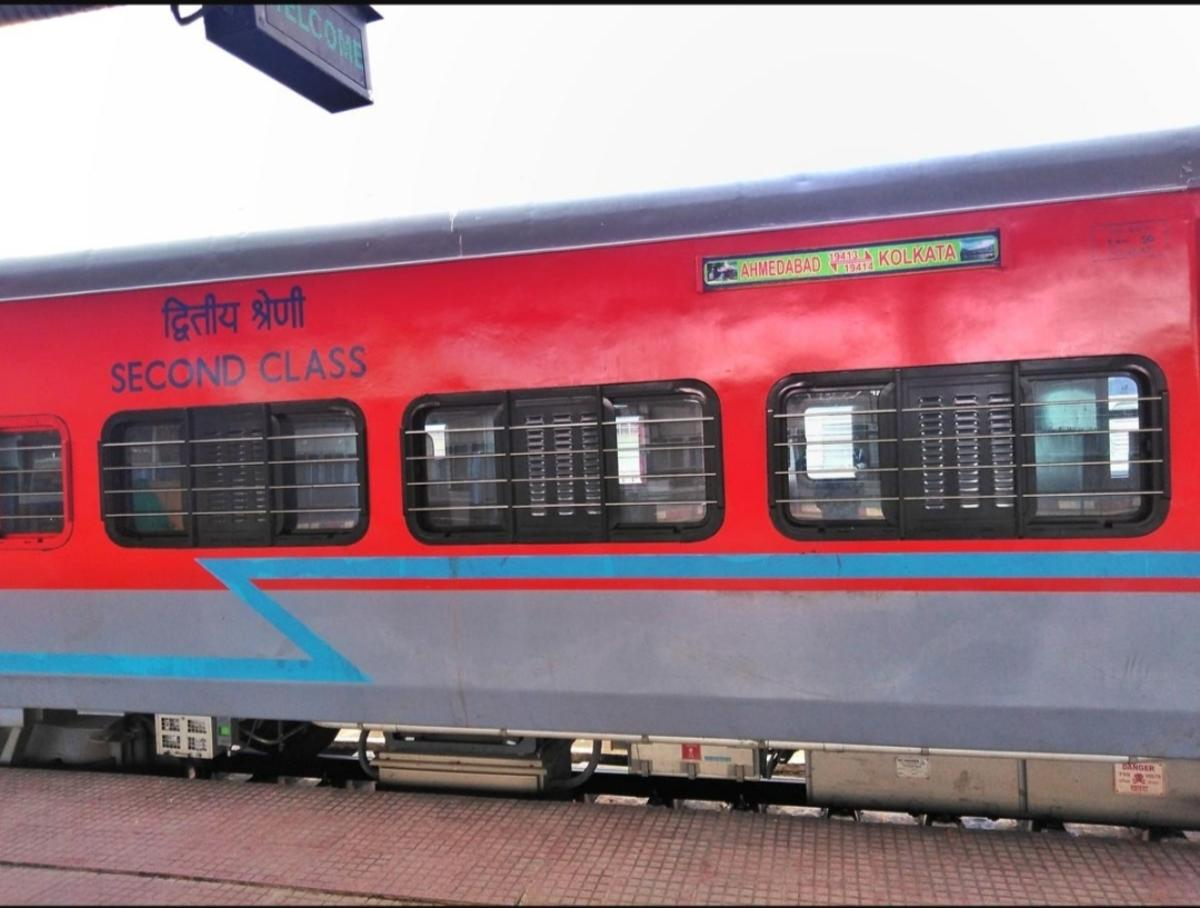
- Second class coach of Kolkata-Ahmedabad Express standing at Ahmedabad.

Overview
- Service type: Express
- Locale: West Bengal, Jharkhand, Uttar Pradesh, Madhya Pradesh, and Gujarat
- First service: 11 October 2010; 15 years ago
- Current operator: Western Railway

Route
- Termini: Kolkata (KOAA); Ahmedabad (ADI)
- Stops: 27
- Distance travelled: 2,089 km (1,298 mi)
- Average journey time: 42 hrs 05 mins
- Service frequency: Weekly
- Train number: 19413 / 19414

On-board services
- Classes: AC 2 Tier, AC 3 Tier, Sleeper Class, General Unreserved
- Seating arrangements: No
- Sleeping arrangements: Available
- Catering facilities: Available
- Observation facilities: Large windows
- Baggage facilities: Available
- Other facilities: Below the seats

Technical
- Rolling stock: LHB coach
- Track gauge: 1,676 mm (5 ft 6 in)
- Operating speed: 49 km/h (30 mph) average including halts.

The 19413 / 19414 Kolkata-Ahmedabad Weekly Express, formerly known as Sare Jahan se Accha Express, is an Indian express train. Kolkata Ahmedabad Weekly Express travels from Kolkata railway station to Ahmedabad railway station, a distance of 2,089 km (1,298 mi) in 42 hours and 05 mins. The train was the first express train to travel from Chitpur railway station (Kolkata) to Ahmedabad railway station. It is hauled by a Tughlakabad (TKD) WAG 9 locomotive, and then to Ahmedabad Junction (ADI) by a Patratu or Abu Road based WDM 3A.

== History ==
The Ahmedabad Kolkata Express initially traveled between Chitpur railway station and Ajmer Junction railway station as a 13 coach train. Later the terminating station was changed to Ahmedabad railway station via Ujjain.

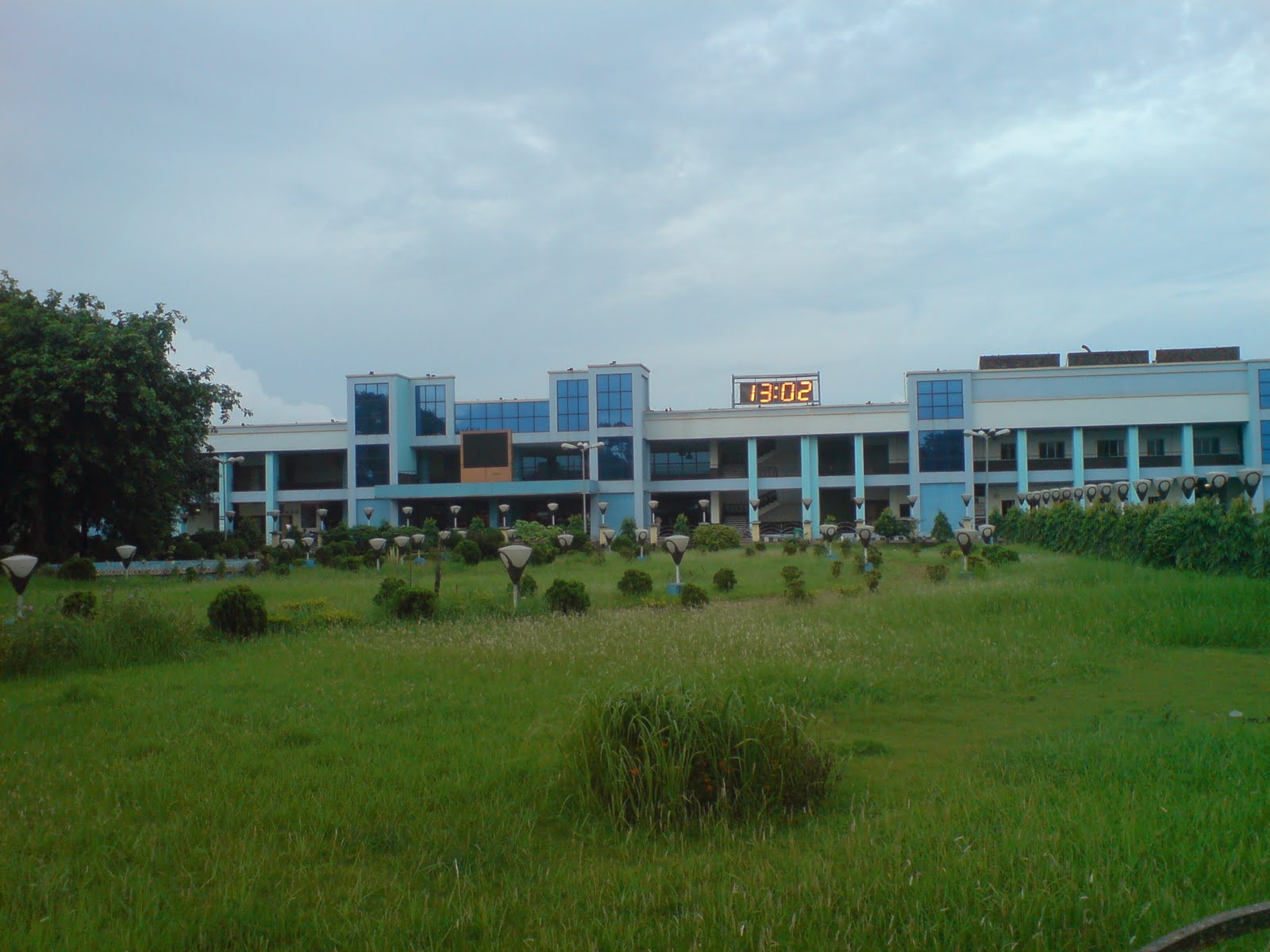
Kolkata Terminal

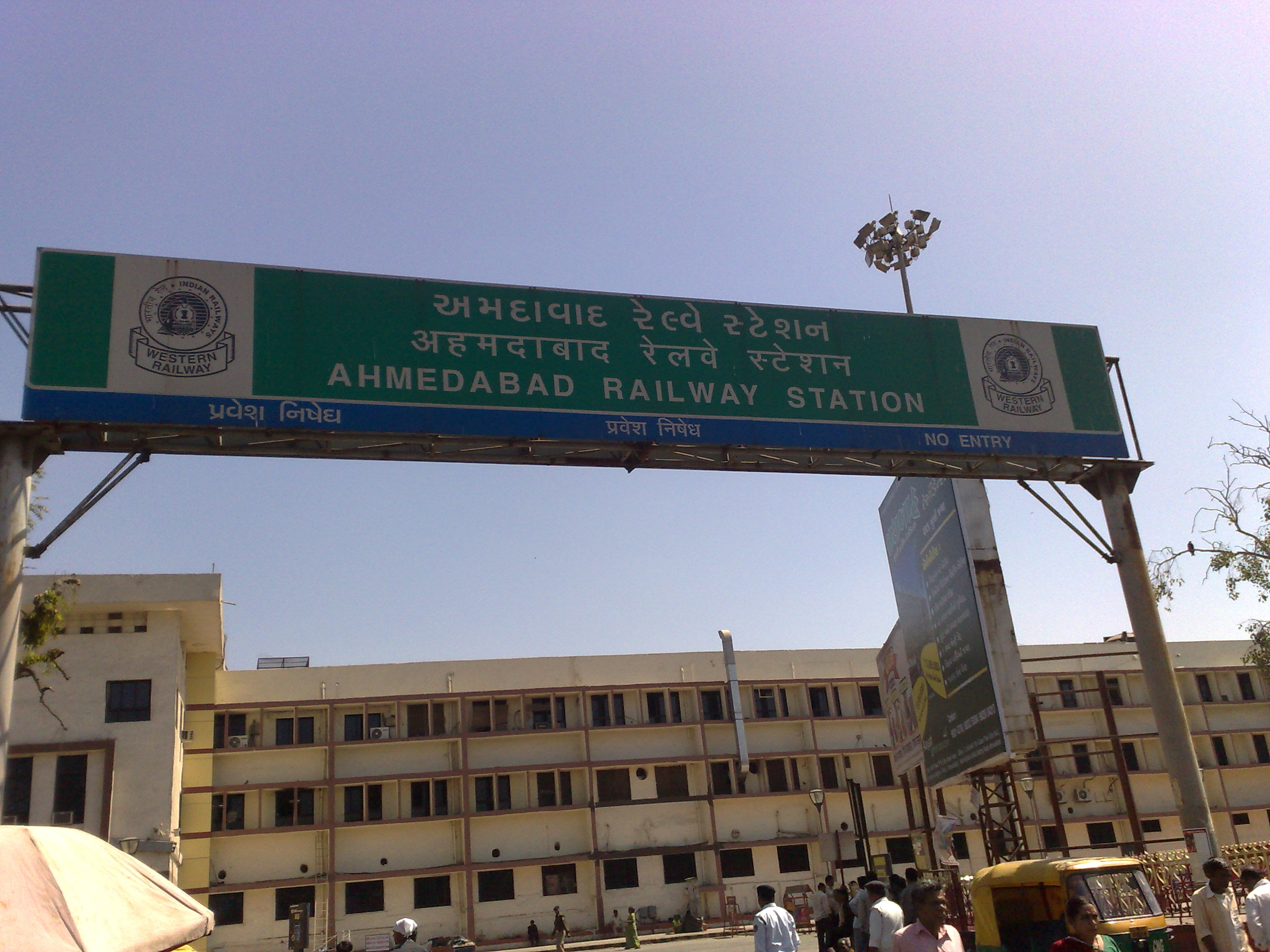
Ahmedabad Junction railway station

== Route and halts ==
The train run from Ahmedabad Junction via Ajmer Junction, Ratlam Junction, Bhopal Junction, Chopan, Barkakana Junction, Dhanbad Junction, Asansol Junction to Kolkata.

The train was rerouted in 2021 and now it goes from Ahmedabad Junction via Chhayapuri, Ratlam Junction, Sant Hirdaram Nagar, Chopan, Barkakana Junction, Dhanbad Junction, Asansol Junction to Kolkata.

=== Direction reversal ===
The train used to reverse its directions 5 times at Ajmer Junction, Ratlam Junction, Bhopal Junction, Chopan and Barkakana Junction. It had the highest number of direction reversals in India. The new route reversed direction twice, at Chopan and Barkakana Junction.

== Service ==
The trains have normal priority on the Indian railway network. They offer four classes of service: Second Class AC 2-tier (bays of 4 berths + 2 berth on the side) with open system berth, Second Class AC 3-tier (bays of 6 berths + 2 berths on the side) with open system berth and Second class 3 tier sleeper (bays of 6 berths + 2 berths on the side). Generally it has 2 AC 2-Tiers, up to 5 AC 3-Tiers ( both of which may be increased according to demand). It has no pantry car, 7 Sleeper Class + 4 UR (Unreserved) + 1 SLR (Second-Class Sitting Cum Luggage Rake) + 1 EOG (End on Generation)

The train covers a distance of 2,089 km (1,298 mi) in 42 hrs 05 minutes.

- Aryan. "09413/Sare Jahan Se Achchha Special - Ahmedabad to Kolkata WR/Western Zone - Railway Enquiry". indiarailinfo.com.
- Chakraborty, Anubad. "09414/Sare Jahan Se Achchha Special - Kolkata to Ahmedabad WR/Western Zone - Railway Enquiry". indiarailinfo.com.

== Coach composition ==
Loco	1	2	3	4	5	6	7	8	9	10	11	12	13	14	15	16	17	18	19	scope="col" rowspan="1" style="background:lightskyblue;"| 20	scope="col" rowspan="1" style="background:lightskyblue;"| style="background:lightskyblue;"| BRKA
	EOG	A1	A2	B1	B2	B3	B4	B5	S1	S2	S3	S4	S5	S6	S7	UR	UR	UR	UR	SLRD	

== See also ==
- Express trains in India
