= Ramgarh Cantonment railway station =

Railway station in Jharkhand

Ramgarh Cantonment station
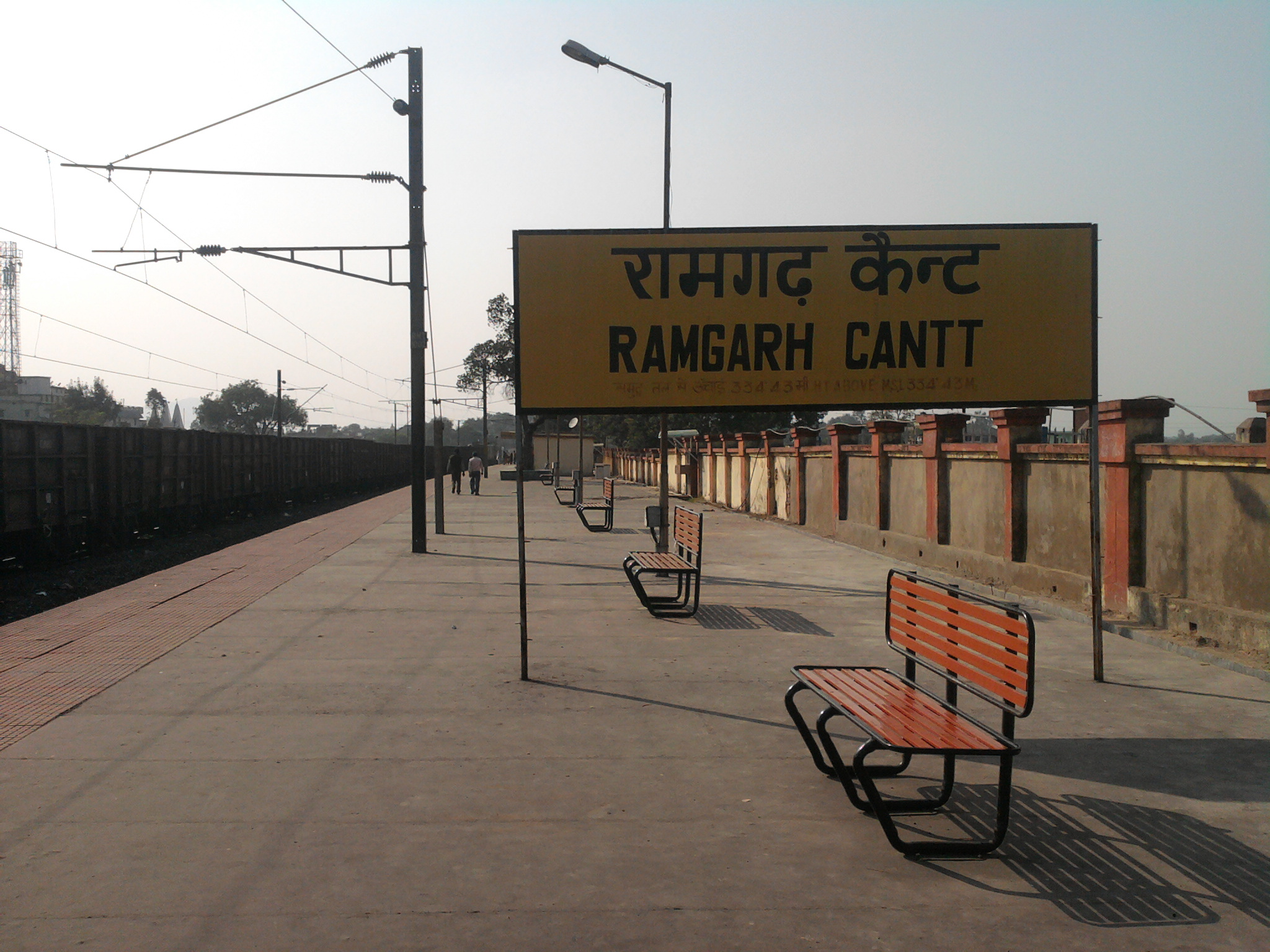
- Ramgarh Cantt signboard

General information
- Location: Ramgarh Cantonment, Ramgarh district, Jharkhand; India
- Coordinates: 23°37′3″N 85°31′15″E
- Elevation: 352 metres (1,155 ft)
- System: Indian Railways station
- Line: Barkakana–Muri–Chandil line
- Platforms: 2

Construction
- Parking: Available

Other information
- Status: Functional
- Station code: RMT
- Zone(s): South Eastern Railway
- Division(s): Ranchi Division
Location

Ramgarh Cantt railway station, serves the city of Ramgarh Cantonment which is the headquarters of the Ramgarh district in the Indian state of Jharkhand. Ramgarh Cantt railway station belongs to the Ranchi division of the South Eastern Railway zone of the Indian Railways.

== Facilities ==
The major facilities available are Waiting rooms, retiring room, computerized reservation facility, Reservation Counter, Vehicle parking etc. The vehicles are allowed to enter the station premises. Security personnel from the Government Railway Police (GRP) are present for security.

== Trains ==
Several electrified local passenger and express trains run from Ramgarh to neighbouring destinations on frequent intervals.

== See also ==
- Ramgarh Cantonment
- Ramgarh district
