= Barwadih Junction railway station =

Railway station in Barwadih, India

BARWADIH JUNCTION
- Indian Railways logo

General information
- Location: Barwadih, Latehar district, Jharkhand; India
- Coordinates: 23.8438°N 84.1168°E
- Elevation: 296 metres (971 ft)
- System: Indian Railways station
- Owner: Indian Railways
- Operator: East Central Railway
- Line: Barkakana–Son Nagar line
- Platforms: 3

Construction
- Structure type: Standard (on-ground Station)
- Parking: Available

Other information
- Status: Functional
- Station code: BRWD
- Zone(s): East Central Railway zone
- Division(s): Dhanbad
Route map
Location
- Location within Jharkhand

Barwadih Junction, (station code: BRWD), is the railway station serving the city of Barwadih which is the connecting point of Latehar and Palamu districts

== History ==
This is one of the junctions connecting Latehar and Palamu districts of Jharkhand. The Railway Ministry plans to build a new 200 km line between Ambikapur (Chhattisgarh) and Barwadih (Jharkhand).

Britishers were the first to moot the proposal way back in 1925 to connect Ambikapur and Barwadih, both coal-rich areas, by rail. The plan was aimed to facilitate the transportation of minerals.

The Britishers knew the importance of the rail line and the work on the project was started in the early 1930s after conducting the survey, sources added. The required land for the project was also acquired. But the work was stopped during World War II and the project had been pending since then, sources said.

The new rail line will give connectivity from Howrah, Dhanbad & Ranchi to Mumbai via Lohardaga, Barkakana, Latehar, Barwadih, Ambikapur, Katni, Jabalpur & Itarsi.

The distance between Howrah and Mumbai via Jabalpur is 2,162.5 km (1,344 mi) km while the same via Nagpur comes to be around 1,970.5 km (1,224 mi). The railway runs maximum trains between both the Metros via Nagpur–Bilaspur section. Besides a daily Kolkata mail, a couple of weekly trains chug on Jabalpur–Itarsi section.

== Facilities ==
The major facilities available are waiting rooms, retiring room, computerized reservation facility, reservation counter, vehicle parking, etc.

=== Platforms ===
The platforms are interconnected with foot overbridge (FOB).

== Trains ==
Several electrified local passenger trains also run from Barwadih to neighbouring destinations on frequent intervals.

Train name	Train number	Source	Destination
BSB RNC Express	18612	Varanasi Junction	Ranchi
Shaktipunj Express	11448	Howrah Junction	Jabalpur Junction
Shaktipunj Express	11447	Jabalpur Junction	Howrah Junction
HTE - ANVT Jharkhand Express	12873	Hatia	Anand Vihar Terminal
RNC CPU Express	18631	Ranchi	Chopan Junction
SBP BSB Express	18311	Sambalpur	Varanasi Junction
HWH BPL Weekly Express	13025	Howrah Junction	Bhopal
TATA JAT Express	18101	Tatanagar Junction	Jammu Tawi
Palamu Express	13347	Barkakana Junction	Patna Junction
Palamu Express	13348	Patna Junction	Barkakana Junction

== Nearest airports ==
The nearest airports to Barwadih Station are:

- Birsa Munda Airport, Ranchi 180 kilometres (110 mi)
- Gaya Airport, Gaya 163 kilometres (101 mi)
- Lok Nayak Jayaprakash Airport, Patna 276 kilometres (171 mi)
- Netaji Subhash Chandra Bose International Airport, Kolkata

== See also ==
- Barwadih
- Latehar
- Palamu
