= Garwa Road Junction railway station =

Railway station in Jharkhand, India

GARHWA ROAD JUNCTION
- Indian Railways logo

General information
- Location: Garhwa Road, Palamu district, Jharkhand; India
- Coordinates: 24.20°N 83.96°E
- Elevation: 197 metres (646 ft)
- System: Indian Railways station
- Owner: Indian Railways
- Operator: East Central Railways
- Platforms: 3
- Tracks: 7

Construction
- Structure type: Standard on-ground
- Parking: Yes

Other information
- Status: Functional
- Station code: GHD
- Zone(s): East Central Railway zone
- Division(s): Dhanbad
Location
- Location within Jharkhand Location within India

Garhwa Road Junction railway station (station code: GHD) is a railway station located in Rehla,Palamu district, Jharkhand, India, some 10 km (6.2 mi) from the town of Garhwa. It belongs to East Central Railway. All major express, mail express and passenger trains stop here.

Three rail section originate from the Garhwa Road Junction :

1. Garhwa Road - Sone Nagar rail section
2. Garhwa Road - Barkakana rail section
3. Garhwa Road - Chopan rail section

== See also ==
- Daltonganj
- Palamu Loksabha constituency
- Jharkhand Legislative Assembly
