= Patratu railway station =

Railway station in Jharkhand

Patratu
- Indian Railways logo

General information
- Location: Patratu, Ramgarh district, Jharkhand; India
- Coordinates: 23.6671°N 85.3056°E
- Elevation: 373 metres (1,224 ft)
- System: Indian Railways station
- Owner: Indian Railways
- Operator: East Central Railways
- Platforms: 3
- Tracks: 4

Construction
- Structure type: Standard (on-ground station)
- Parking: Yes
- Cycle facilities: No

Other information
- Status: Functioning
- Station code: PTRU
- Zone(s): East Central Railway zone
- Division(s): Dhanbad
Location
- Location within Jharkhand Location within India

Patratu railway station is a small railway station in Ramgarh district, Jharkhand. Its code is PTRU. It serves Patratu town. The station consists of a two-platform. The platform is sheltered. It has facilities including water and sanitation but are not well maintained.

== Diesel Loco Shed, Patratu ==
Diesel Loco Shed, Patratu came into existence in 1962. Patratu Diesel Shed is a major Loco Shed of Dhanbad Division having holding more than 100 locos.

Serial No.	Locomotive Class	Horsepower	Quantity
1.	WAG-9	6120	137
2.	WDG-4/4D	4000/4500	79
Total Locomotives Active as of February 2026			216
