= Dhanbad–Lokmanya Tilak Terminus Weekly Express =

Train in India

Dhanbad - Mumbai LTT Weekly Express

Overview
- Service type: Express
- Status: Active
- Locale: Jharkhand, Uttar Pradesh, Madhya Pradesh and Maharashtra
- First service: 6 April 2026; 5 months ago
- Current operator: East Central (EC)

Route
- Termini: Dhanbad Junction (DHN); Mumbai LTT (LTT)
- Stops: 29
- Distance travelled: 1,844 km (1,146 mi)
- Average journey time: 38h 40m
- Service frequency: Weekly
- Train number: 13379 / 13380

On-board services
- Classes: General Unreserved, Sleeper Class, AC 3rd Class Economy, AC 3rd Class, AC 2nd Class
- Seating arrangements: Yes
- Sleeping arrangements: Yes
- Catering facilities: Pantry Car
- Observation facilities: Large windows
- Baggage facilities: No
- Other facilities: Below the seats

Technical
- Rolling stock: LHB coach
- Track gauge: 1,676 mm (5 ft 6 in)
- Electrification: 25 kV 50 Hz AC Overhead line
- Operating speed: 130 km/h (81 mph) maximum, 48 km/h (30 mph) average including halts.
- Track owner: Indian Railways

The 13379 / 13380 Dhanbad–Lokmanya Tilak Terminus Weekly Express is an express train belonging to East Central Railway zone that runs between the city Dhanbad Junction of Jharkhand and Lokmanya Tilak Terminus of Maharashtra in India.

It operates as train number 13379 from Dhanbad Junction to Lokmanya Tilak Terminus and as train number 13380 in the reverse direction, serving the states of Maharashtra, Madhya Pradesh, Uttar Pradesh and Jharkhand.

== Services ==
• 13379/ Dhanbad–Lokmanya Tilak Terminus Weekly Express has an average speed of 48 km/h and covers 1844 km in 38h 40m.

• 13380/ Lokmanya Tilak Terminus–Dhanbad Weekly Express has an average speed of 47 km/h and covers 1844 km in 39h 5m.

== Routes and halts ==
The Important Halts of the train are :

● Dhanbad Junction

● Katrasgarh

● Chandrapura Junction

● Bokaro Thermal

● Ranchi Road

● Patratu

● Khalari

● Latehar

● Daltonganj

● Garwa Road Junction

● Renukoot

● Obra Dam

● Singrauli

● Bargawan

● Beohari

● Khanna Banjari

● Katni South

● Jabalpur Junction

● Narsinghpur

● Pipariya

● Itarsi Junction

● Bhusaval Junction

● Jalgaon Junction

● Chalisgaon Junction

● Manmad Junction

● Nashik Road

● Igatpuri

● Kalyan Junction

● Mumbai LTT

== Schedule ==
• 13379 - 11:00 PM (Monday) [Dhanbad Junction]

• 13380 - 4:55 PM (Wednesday) [Mumbai LTT]

== Traction ==
As the entire route is fully electrified it is hauled by a Gomoh Shed-based WAP-7 electric locomotive from Dhanbad Junction to Mumbai LTT and vice versa.

== See also ==
Trains from Dhanbad Junction :

1. Dhanbad–Patna Intercity Express
2. Bhubaneswar–Dhanbad Express
3. Dhanbad–Sasaram Intercity Express
4. Swarnarekha Express
5. Dhanbad–Ranchi Intercity Express

Trains from Lokmanya Tilak Terminus :

1. Ranchi–Lokmanya Tilak Terminus Weekly Express
2. Lokmanya Tilak Terminus–Secunderabad AC Duronto Express
3. Kamayani Express
4. Lokmanya Tilak Terminus–Hazrat Nizamuddin AC Express
5. Mumbai LTT–Saharsa Amrit Bharat Express

== Notes ==
a. Runs 1 day in a week with both directions.
