= Katrasgarh railway station =

Railway station in Dhanbad, Jharkhand, India

Katrasgarh Railway Station
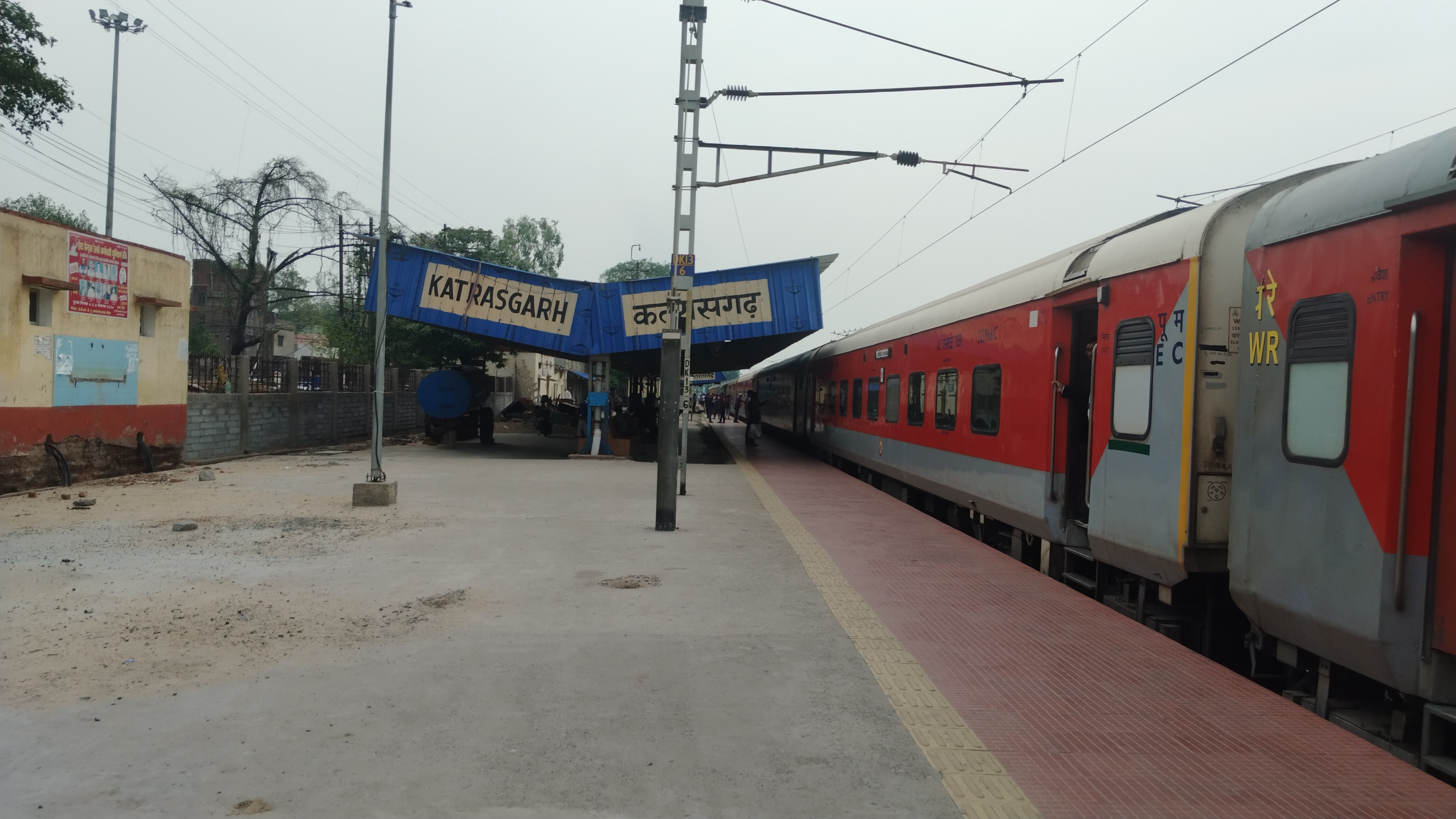

General information
- Other names: Katras
- Location: Katrasgarh, Dhanbad district, Jharkhand; India
- Coordinates: | coordinates = 23.7856°N 86.2875°E
- Elevation: 198 m (650 ft)
- System: Indian Railways station
- Owner: Indian Railways
- Operator: East Central Railway zone
- Line: Dhanbad–Chandrapura line
- Platforms: 3
- Tracks: 2

Construction
- Structure type: Standard (on-ground station)
- Parking: Available

Other information
- Status: Functioning
Location
- Location within Jharkhand Location within India

Katrasgarh railway station (station code: KTH) is a railway station located in Dhanbad district in the Indian state of Jharkhand. It is administered by the Dhanbad railway division of the East Central Railway zone of Indian Railways. The station serves Katrasgarh town and surrounding coalfield regions.

The station lies on the Dhanbad–Chandrapura line, which forms an important rail link in the Jharia Coalfield belt. The section connects major industrial and urban centres of Jharkhand and is used by both passenger and freight services.

== History ==
Katrasgarh railway station developed as part of the coalfield railway network connecting Dhanbad with Chandrapura and nearby mining areas. Train services on the Dhanbad–Chandrapura section were suspended in 2017 due to safety concerns related to underground mine fire and land subsidence risks. Services were restored in 2019 after completion of necessary safety measures and public demand for rail connectivity.

== Importance ==
The station is an important passenger halt on the Dhanbad–Chandrapura section. It provides connectivity to key cities such as Dhanbad, Bokaro Steel City and Ranchi. The station is mainly used by daily commuters, students and workers associated with coalfield and industrial activities in the region.

== Major trains ==
Some important trains serving Katrasgarh railway station include:

- Dhanbad–Alappuzha Express
- Podanur–Dhanbad Amrit Bharat Express
- Dhanbad - Mumbai LTT Weekly Express
- Dhanbad - Bhopal Express
- Dhanbad–Ranchi Intercity Express
- Shaktipunj Express
- Kolkata - Madar Express
- Kolkata - Ahmedabad Express
- Vasco-da-Gama - Jasidih Express
- Vananchal Express
- Patliputra Express
- Maurya Express
- Jhargram - Dhanbad MEMU Express
- Dhanbad - Chandrapura Passenger

== See also ==
- Dhanbad Junction railway station
- Chandrapura Junction railway station
- Dhanbad–Chandrapura line
