= Sijua =

- Neighbourhood in Dhanbad
- Location in Jharkhand, India Sijua (India)
- Coordinates: 23.78°N 86.32°E
- Country: India
- State: Jharkhand
- District: Dhanbad
- Elevation: 181 m (594 ft)

Population (2001)
  - Total: 29,797

Languages
  - Official: Hindi, Urdu
- Time zone: UTC+5:30 (IST)
- PIN: 828121
- Telephone code: 0326
- Vehicle registration: JH
- Website: dhanbad.nic.in

Sijua is a neighbourhood in Dhanbad in Dhanbad Sadar subdivision of Dhanbad district in Jharkhand state, India.

== Geography ==
Cities, towns and locations in the central portion of Dhanbad Sadar subdivision in Dhanbad district
MC: Municipal Corporation, CT: Census Town, N: Neighbourhood, R: Rural/ Urban centre
Owing to space constraints in the small map, the actual locations in a larger map may vary slightly

=== Location ===
Sijua is located at 23.78°N 86.32°E. It has an average elevation of 181 metres (593 feet).

Note: The map alongside presents some of the notable locations in the area. All places marked in the map are linked in the larger full screen map.

The earlier census town was combined with other urban units to form Dhanbad Municipal Corporation in 2006.

Sijua is part of Ward No. 7 of Dhanbad Municipal Corporation.

=== Overview ===
The region shown in the map is a part of the undulating uplands bustling with coalmines in the lowest rung of the Chota Nagpur Plateau. The entire area shown in the map is under Dhanbad Municipal Corporation, except Belgaria which is under Baliapur (community development block). The places in the DMC area are marked as neighbourhoods. The DMC area shown in the map is around the core area of Dhanbad city. Another major area of DMC is shown in the map of the southern portion of the district. A small stretch of DMC, extending up to Katras is shown in the map of the western portion. The region is fully urbanised. Jharia (community development block) has been merged into DMC. Three operational areas of BCCL operate fully within the region – Sijua Area, Kusunda Area and Bastacola Area.

== Demographics ==
As of 2001 India census, Sijua had a population of 29,797. Males constitute 54% of the population and females 46%. Sijua has an average literacy rate of 62%, higher than the national average of 59.5%: male literacy is 71%, and female literacy is 50%. In Sijua, 14% of the population is under 6 years of age.

== Economy ==
Tata Steel and BCCL are the major coal companies in Sijua.

The Sijua Area of BCCL is composed of: Basdeopur colliery (underground), Kankanee colliery (UG and open cast), Loyabad colliery (UG) (mostly non-functional), Mudidih colliery (UG and OC), Nichitpur Colliery (OC), Sendra Bansjora colliery (UG and OC) and Tetulmari colliery (UG and OC).

Tata Steel leased six coal mines with metallurgical coal in Jharia coalfield between 1910 and 1918, These are grouped in two locations – Sijua and Jamadoba. The Bhelatand colliery of the Sijua Group was then acquired. Subsequently in 1918, Tata Steel acquired Malkera and Sijua as well as Jamadoba, Digwadih and 6&7 Pits Collieries of the Jamadoba Group. In 1993 Tata Steel set up a 1 million tonnes per annum coal washery at Bhelatand.

== Transportation ==
Sijua is situated at a distance of 12 km from Dhanbad (Railway Track Distance), which is a major city in the adjoining area. It is also situated 4 km from Katras, the local centre for trade and commerce. It is well connected by railways as well as by road. Being is a unique location, Sijua is lucky enough to have railway access along three different railway lines, the corresponding stations being Sijua (under the Dhanbad-Chandrapura line under the Dhanbad Railway Division, East Central Railway), Tetulmari (under the CIC section of Dhanbad Railway Division, East Central Railway) and Tata-Sijua (under the Adra railway division, South Eastern Railway). The Dhanbad - Chandrapura Passenger and Jhargram - Dhanbad MEMU Express halts at Sijua Railway Station.

Sijua is also connected to Dhanbad via road, courtesy of the JNURM buses and auto-rickshaws plying along the Dhanbad-Katras route.

Train services on the 123-year old and 34 km long Dhanbad-Chandrapura line were closed on June 15, 2017 because of the risk of coal-seam fire. Fourteen stations, including Kusunda, Baseria, Bansjora, Sijua, Angarpathra, Katrasgarh, Tetulia, Sonardih, and Jamunia, were affected.

== Education ==
De Nobili School, Sijua is one of the major schools (ICSE) which caters to the higher secondary level.

Tata D A V School, Sijua is another higher secondary school. It is run by TATA Steel and D A V organizing committee. It is CBSE based. It is considered as the excellent school of Sijua. It has one library
