= Dhanbad - Mumbai LTT Weekly Express =

Dhanbad–Lokmanya Tilak Terminus Express
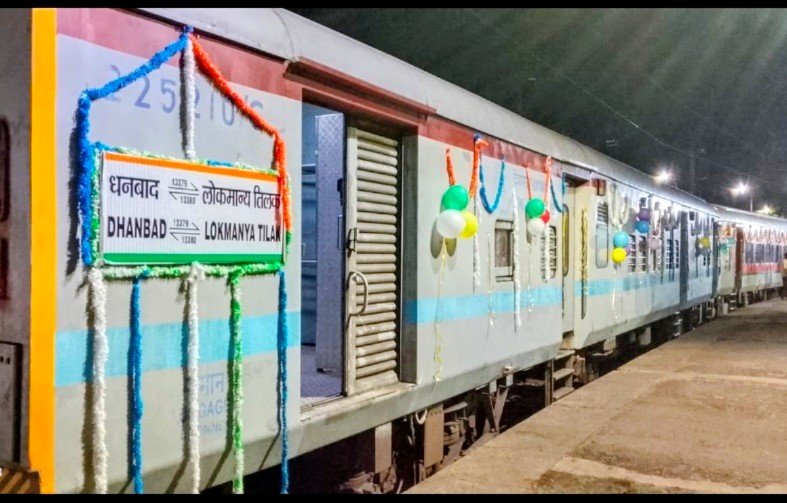

Overview
- Service type: Express
- Status: Operating
- Locale: Jharkhand, Uttar Pradesh, Madhya Pradesh, Maharashtra
- First service: 13379: 6 April 2026; 58 days ago 13380: 8 April 2026; 56 days ago (Commercial)
- Current operator: East Central Railway

Route
- Termini: Dhanbad Junction; Lokmanya Tilak Terminus
- Stops: 29
- Distance travelled: 1,844 km (1,146 mi)
- Average journey time: 13379: 38 hours 40 minutes 13380: 39 hours 05 minutes
- Service frequency: Weekly
- Train number: 13379 / 13380

On-board services
- Classes: AC 2 Tier, AC 3 Tier, AC 3 Economy, Sleeper Class, General Unreserved
- Seating arrangements: Yes
- Sleeping arrangements: Yes
- Catering facilities: Available

Technical
- Rolling stock: LHB coaches
- Operating speed: 48 km (30 mi)
- Depot: Dhanbad Junction
- Rake maintenance: Dhanbad Junction
- Rake sharing: No

The 13379/13380 Dhanbad–Lokmanya Tilak Terminus Express is an Express train of Indian Railways connecting Dhanbad Junction in Jharkhand with Lokmanya Tilak Terminus in Mumbai, Maharashtra.

The train was earlier operated as special service numbers 03379/03380 and was later regularised as 13379/13380. The regular service of 13379 Dhanbad - Mumbai LTT Weekly Express commenced on April 06, 2026 from Dhanbad and the regular service of 13380 Mumbai LTT - Dhanbad Weekly Express commenced on April 08, 2026. The train is operated by the East Central Railway zone.

== Service ==
Train no. 13379 departs from Dhanbad Junction at 23:00 hrs every Monday and arrives at Lokmanya Tilak Terminus at 13:40 hrs every Wednesday, on the third day of its journey, while the return train, 13380, departs from Lokmanya Tilak Terminus at 16:55 hrs every Wednesday and reaches Dhanbad Junction at around 08:00 hrs every Friday, also on the third day of its journey.

The train covers a distance of around 1,844 km and halts at important stations including Katrasgarh, Chandrapura, Patratu, Latehar, Garhwa Road, Renukut, Singrauli, Katni South, Jabalpur, Itarsi, Bhusaval, Manmad and Kalyan.

== Halts ==
The important halts of the train include:

- Katrasgarh
- Chandrapura Junction
- Bokaro Thermal
- Ranchi Road
- Patratu
- Khalari
- Tori
- Latehar
- DaltonGanj
- Garhwa Road Junction
- Renukut
- Obra Dam
- Singrauli
- Katni South
- Jabalpur Junction
- Narsinghpur
- Itarsi Junction
- Bhusaval Junction
- Jalgaon Junction
- Chalisgaon Junction
- Manmad Junction
- Nashik Road
- Kalyan Junction

== Coach composition ==
The train generally runs with LHB coaches comprising AC 2 Tier, AC 3 Tier, AC 3 Economy, Sleeper Class, General Unreserved coaches and SLR coaches.

== Route ==
The train runs through the states of Jharkhand, Uttar Pradesh, Madhya Pradesh and Maharashtra providing long-distance connectivity between eastern coal belt regions and western India.

== See also ==
- Dhanbad Junction railway station
- Lokmanya Tilak Terminus railway station
- Indian Railways
- East Central Railway zone
