= Podanur–Dhanbad Amrit Bharat Express =

Amrit Bharat Express train route in India

Podanur – Dhanbad Amrit Bharat Express
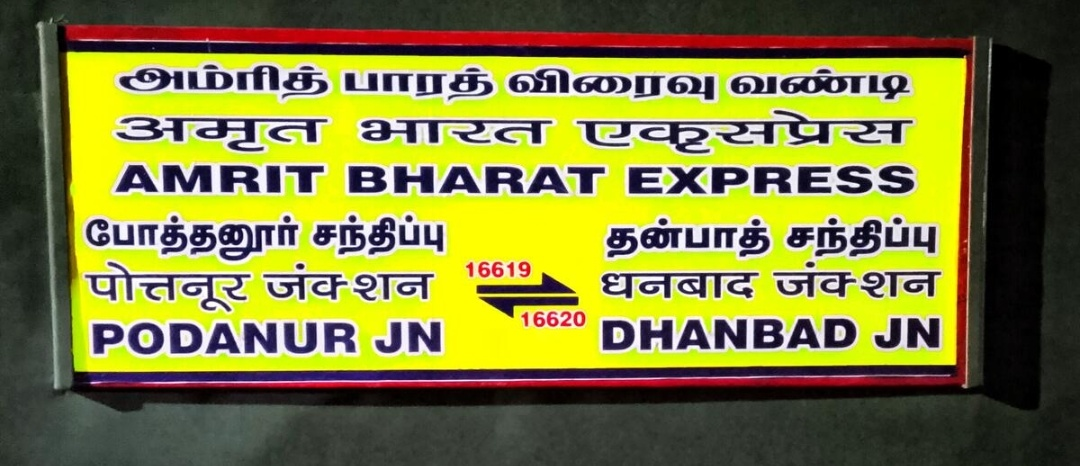

Overview
- Service type: Amrit Bharat Express, Express trains in India
- Status: Active
- Locale: Tamil Nadu, Andhra Pradesh, Odisha and Jharkhand
- First service: 11 March 2026; 44 days ago (Inaugural); 21 March 2026; 34 days ago (Commercial)
- Current operator: Southern Railways (SR)

Route
- Termini: Podanur Junction (PTJ); Dhanbad Junction (DHN)
- Stops: 36
- Distance travelled: 2,199 km (1,366 mi)
- Average journey time: 45 hrs 45 mins
- Service frequency: Weekly
- Train number: 16119/16120
- Lines used: Podanur–Coimbatore line; Erode–Salem–Jolarpettai line; Katpadi–Renigunta–Vijayawada line; Vijayawada–Duvvada line; Vizianagaram–Jharsuguda line; Rourkela–Hatia line; Ranchi–Bokaro Steel City line; Chandrapura–Dhanbad line

On-board services
- Class: Sleeper Class Coach (SL) General Unreserved Coach (GS)
- Seating arrangements: Yes
- Sleeping arrangements: Yes
- Auto-rack arrangements: Upper
- Catering facilities: On-board Catering
- Observation facilities: Saffron-Grey
- Entertainment facilities: Electric Outlets; Reading lights; Bottle Holder
- Other facilities: CCTV cameras; Bio-Vacuum Toilets; Foot-Operated Water Taps; Passenger information system

Technical
- Rolling stock: Modified LHB Coaches
- Track gauge: Indian gauge 1,676 mm (5 ft 6 in) broad gauge
- Electrification: 25 kV 50 Hz AC Overhead line
- Operating speed: 48 km (30 mi) (Avg.)
- Track owner: Indian Railways
- Rake maintenance: Coimbatore Jn (CBE)
- Rake sharing: No

The 16119/16120 Podanur–Dhanbad Amrit Bharat Express is India's 28th Non-AC Superfast Amrit Bharat Express train, which runs across the states of Tamil Nadu, Andhra Pradesh, Odisha and Jharkhand by connecting the Manchester city of South India, Coimbatore to the north metropolis & coal city, Dhanbad.

The express train is inaugurated on 11 March 2026 by Honorable Prime Minister Narendra Modi through video conference.

== Overview ==
The train is operated by Indian Railways, connecting Podanur Junction and Dhanbad Junction. It is currently operated 16119/16120 on weekly basis.

== Rakes ==
It is the 28th Amrit Bharat 2.0 Express train in which the locomotives were designed by Chittaranjan Locomotive Works (CLW) at Chittaranjan, West Bengal and the coaches were designed and manufactured by the Integral Coach Factory at Perambur, Chennai under the Make in India Initiative.

== Schedule ==
Train Schedule: Podanur ↔ Dhanbad Amrit Bharat Express
Train No.	Station Code	Departure Station	Departure Time	Departure Day	Arrival Station	Arrival Hours
16119	PTJ	Podanur Junction	06:15 AM	Dhanbad Junction	04:00 AM	45h 45m
16120	DHN	Dhanbad Junction	02:00 PM	Podanur Junction	11:15 AM	45h 15m

== Routes and halts ==
The Important halts of the train are :

- Podanur Junction
- Coimbatore Junction
- Tiruppur
- Erode Junction
- Salem Junction
- Jolarpettai Junction
- Katpadi Junction
- Tiruttani
- Renigunta Junction
- Nellore
- Ongole
- Vijayawada Junction
- Eluru
- Rajahmundry
- Samalkot Junction
- Duvvada
- Kottavalasa Junction
- Vizianagaram Junction
- Bobbili Junction
- Parvathipuram
- Rayagada
- Muniguda
- Kesinga
- Titlagarh Junction
- Balangir Junction
- Bargarh Road
- Sambalpur Junction
- Jharsuguda Junction
- Rourkela Junction
- Hatia
- Ranchi Junction
- Muri Junction
- Bokaro Steel City
- Chandrapura Junction
- Katrasgarh
- Dhanbad Junction

== Rake reversal or rake share ==
No rake Reversal or rake share.

== See also ==
- Amrit Bharat Express
- Vande Bharat Express
- Rajdhani Express
- Podanur Junction railway station
- Dhanbad Junction railway station

== Notes ==
a. Runs a day in a week with both directions.
