= Dhanbad–Chandrapura Passenger =

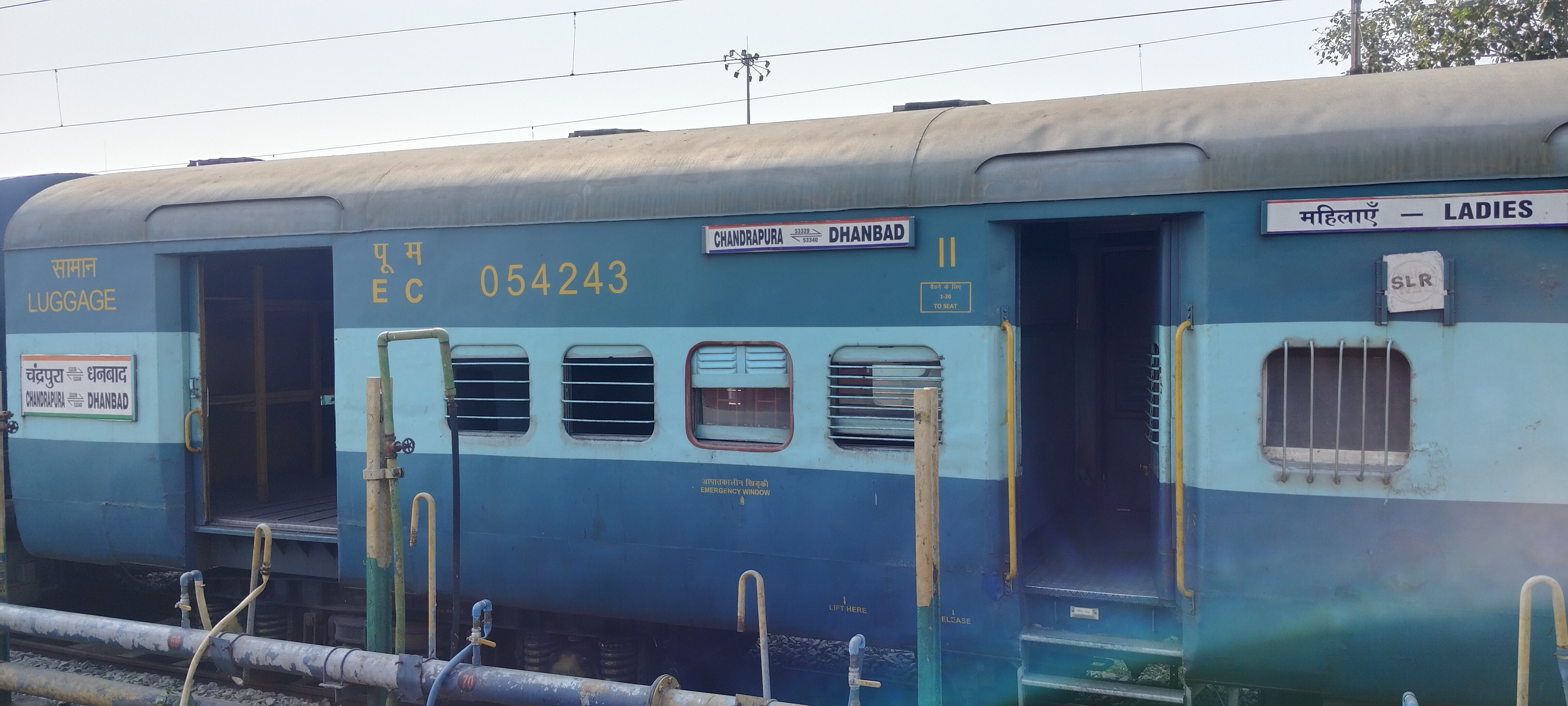

Overview
- Service type: Passenger
- Status: Operating
- First service: January 01, 2025
- Current operator: East Central Railway

Route
- Termini: Dhanbad Junction (DHN); Chandrapura (CRP)
- Stops: 9
- Distance travelled: 34 km (21 mi)
- Average journey time: 01hr 35min
- Service frequency: Monday to Saturday
- Train number: 53339 / 53340

On-board services
- Catering facilities: No
- Baggage facilities: Yes
- Other facilities: Charging

Technical
- Rolling stock: ICF coach
- Track gauge: 1,676 mm (5 ft 6 in)
- Operating speed: 21 km/h (13 mph) average including halts
- Rake maintenance: Dhanbad Junction (DHN)
- Rake sharing: NA

The 53339/53340 Chandrapura-Dhanbad Passenger is a passenger train belonging to Indian Railways East Central Railway zone that runs between Dhanbad and Chandrapura in India.

The service of 53339/53340 Dhanbad–Chandrapura Passenger was stopped on 15 July 2017 due to closure of Dhanbad–Chandrapura line.

On 10 January 2024 onwards Ministry of Railway has approved restoration as 03332/03331 Dhanbad–Chandrapura Passenger Special.

January 01, 2025 the train was restored with normal train 53339/53340 Chandrapura - Dhanbad Passenger.

== Route and halts ==
The important halts of the train are:

- Dhanbad Junction
- Kusunda Jn
- Baseria
- Bansjora
- Sijua
- Katrasgarh
- Sonardih
- Phulwartanr
- Jamunia Tand
- Deonagar
- Chandrapura Junction
