= Dhanbad–Chandrapura line =

Railway line in India

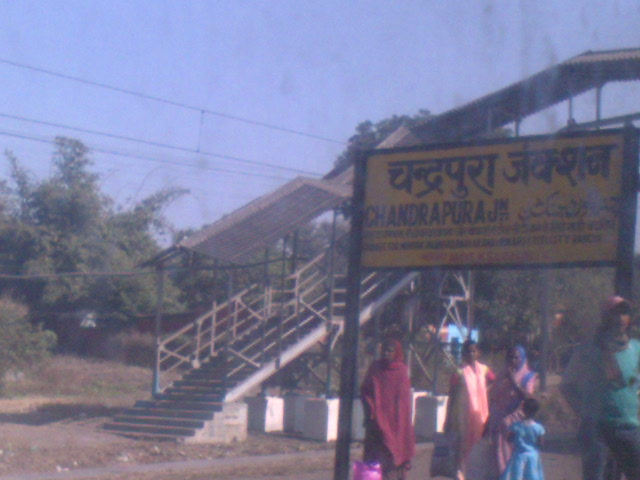
- Chandrapura railway station, the ending point of Dhanbad–Chandrapura rail line

Overview
- Status: Restarted from 6th of February 2019
- Owner: Indian Railways
- Locale: Jharkhand
- Termini: Dhanbad; Chandrapura

Service
- Type: Regional rail
- Operator(s): East Central Railway, South Eastern Railway

History
- Opened: 1894
- Closed: 2017
- Reopened: 2019

Technical
- Track length: 34 km (21 mi)
- Number of tracks: 2
- Track gauge: 5 ft 6 in (1,676 mm) broad gauge
- Electrification: 1960–61 onwards with 25 kV AC overhead
- Operating speed: 80 kilometres per hour (50 mph)

Dhanbad–Chandrapura line is a railway passing through Railways in Jharia Coalfield lying between the Dhanbad line on the north and the Chandrapura in the south. It remained temporarily closed due to fire and subsidence in Jharia Coal Fields. It was initially started as Dhanbad–Katras rail line and was extended up to Chandrapura in 1930. The first train in this route ran from Dhanbad to Katrasgarh. The rail line was laid late nineteenth century by extending the Grand Chord to Katrasgarh via Dhanbad in 1894. This line was opened in 1930.

The Netaji SC Bose Gomoh-Chandrapura-Dhanbad sector was electrified in 1986–87. The line was closed due to a mine fire reaching the tracks, thus making it unsafe for use. The railway also suspended good traffic on the line which has nine loading side of Bharat Coking Coal Limited. However, the line was reopened on 24 February 2019 due to agitations & protests by the people of the region.

== Trains ==
=== Train stopping at Chandrapura ===
- 18621/22 Patna–Hatia Patliputra Express
- 18603/04 Ranchi–Godda Express
- 15027/28 Maurya Express
- 13403/04 Vananchal Express
- 18629/30 Ranchi-Gorakhpur Weekly Express
- 13303/04 Dhanbad-Ranchi Intercity Express
- 18105/06 Jaynagar–Rourkela Express
- 13319/20 Dumka–Ranchi Intercity Express
- 12019/20 Howrah–Ranchi Shatabdi Express
- 15661/62 Ranchi–Kamakhya Express
- 13351/52 Dhanbad–Alappuzha Express
- 17321/22 Jasidih-Vasco-da-Gama Weekly Express
- 19413/14 Ahmedabad–Kolkata Express
- 19607/08 Kolkata-Madar Express
- 11447/48 Shaktipunj Express
- 53339/40 Dhanbad - Chandrapura Passenger
- 13425/26 Surat–Malda Town Express
- 18619/20 Ranchi–Godda Intercity Express

=== Trains skipping Chandrapura ===
- 18185/86 Tatanagar-Godda Weekly Express
- 18119/20 Jaynagar-Tatanagar Express
- 17007/08 Secunderabad–Darbhanga Express
- 17005/06 Hyderabad-Raxaul Express
- 13025/26 Howrah–Bhopal Weekly Express

=== Other Trains ===
- Dhanbad–Bhubaneswar Garib Rath Express (Currently not operational instead a special train 02831/32 is operating)
- Ranchi–New Jalpaiguri Express (Currently not operational)
- Jhargram–Dhanbad MEMU
- Dhanbad-Muri Passenger (Currently not operational)
- Bokaro Steel City Howrah Fast Passenger
- Dhanbad–Ranchi Passenger (Currently not operational)
- Bhojudih-Chandrapura MEMU

== See also ==
- Railways in Jharia Coalfield
