= Kolkata–Madar Express =

Train in India

Madar (Ajmer)–Kolkata Express

Overview
- Service type: Express
- First service: 19 February 2012; 13 years ago
- Current operator(s): North Western Railway

Route
- Termini: Madar Junction (MDJN); Kolkata (KOAA)
- Stops: 31
- Distance travelled: 1,981 km (1,231 mi)
- Average journey time: 41 hrs 30 mins
- Service frequency: Weekly (Note: Runs one day in a week for every direction.)
- Train number(s): 19607 / 19608

On-board services
- Class(es): AC 2 Tier, AC 3 Tier, AC 3 Tier Economy, Sleeper Class, General Unreserved
- Seating arrangements: No
- Sleeping arrangements: Yes
- Catering facilities: On-board catering, E-catering
- Observation facilities: Large windows
- Baggage facilities: No
- Other facilities: Below the seats

Technical
- Rolling stock: LHB coach
- Track gauge: 1,676 mm (5 ft 6 in)
- Operating speed: 48 km/h (30 mph) average including halts.

The 19607 / 19608 Madar (Ajmer)–Kolkata Express is an express train belonging to the North Western Railway zone that runs between Madar Junction (MDJN) railway station of Ajmer Junction (AII) and Kolkata Chitpur (KOAA) in India. It is currently being operated with 19607/19608 train numbers on a weekly basis.

== Service ==
The 19608/Madar (Ajmer)–Kolkata Express has an average speed of 48 km/h and covers 1977 km in 41h 25m. The 19607/Kolkata–Madar Weekly Express has an average speed of 47 km/h and covers 1977 km in 41h 35m.

== Route and halts ==
Halts of the Train:

- Kolkata
- Naihati Junction
- Bandel Junction
- Barddhaman Junction
- Durgapur
- Raniganj
- Asansol Junction
- Dhanbad Junction
- Katrashgarh
- Chandrapura Junction
- Phusro
- Bokaro Thermal
- Ranchi Road
- Daltonganj
- Garwa Road Junction
- Renukut
- Chopan
- Singrauli
- Bargawan
- Beohari
- Katni Murwara Junction
- Damoh
- Saugor
- Mungaoli
- Ashoknagar
- Guna Junction
- Baran
- Sogariya
- Bundi
- Chanderiya
- Bhilwara
- Ajmer Junction
- Madar Junction

== Coach composition ==
The train now runs with LHB rakes with a Maximum Permissible Speed : 130 km/h

The train consists of 22 coaches:

- 2 AC II Tier
- 6 AC III Tier
- 3 AC lll Economy
- 5 Sleeper coaches
- 4 General coaches
- 1 EOG (End on Generation)
- 1 SLR (Seating cum Luggage Rake)

Runs as a dedicated rake without rake sharing. Single LHB rake belongs to North Western Railway (Ajmer) Division.

== Traction ==
It is hauled by an Vadodara Loco Shed-based WAP-7 electric locomotive from Madar Junction to Kolkata Terminal and vice versa.

== Direction reversal ==
The train reverses its direction only 1 time:

- Chopan

== See also ==
- Kolkata railway station
- Madar Junction railway station
- Bhagalpur–New Delhi Weekly Superfast Express
