= Vasco-da-Gama – Jasidih Weekly Express =

Vasco-da-Gama–Jasidih Weekly Express
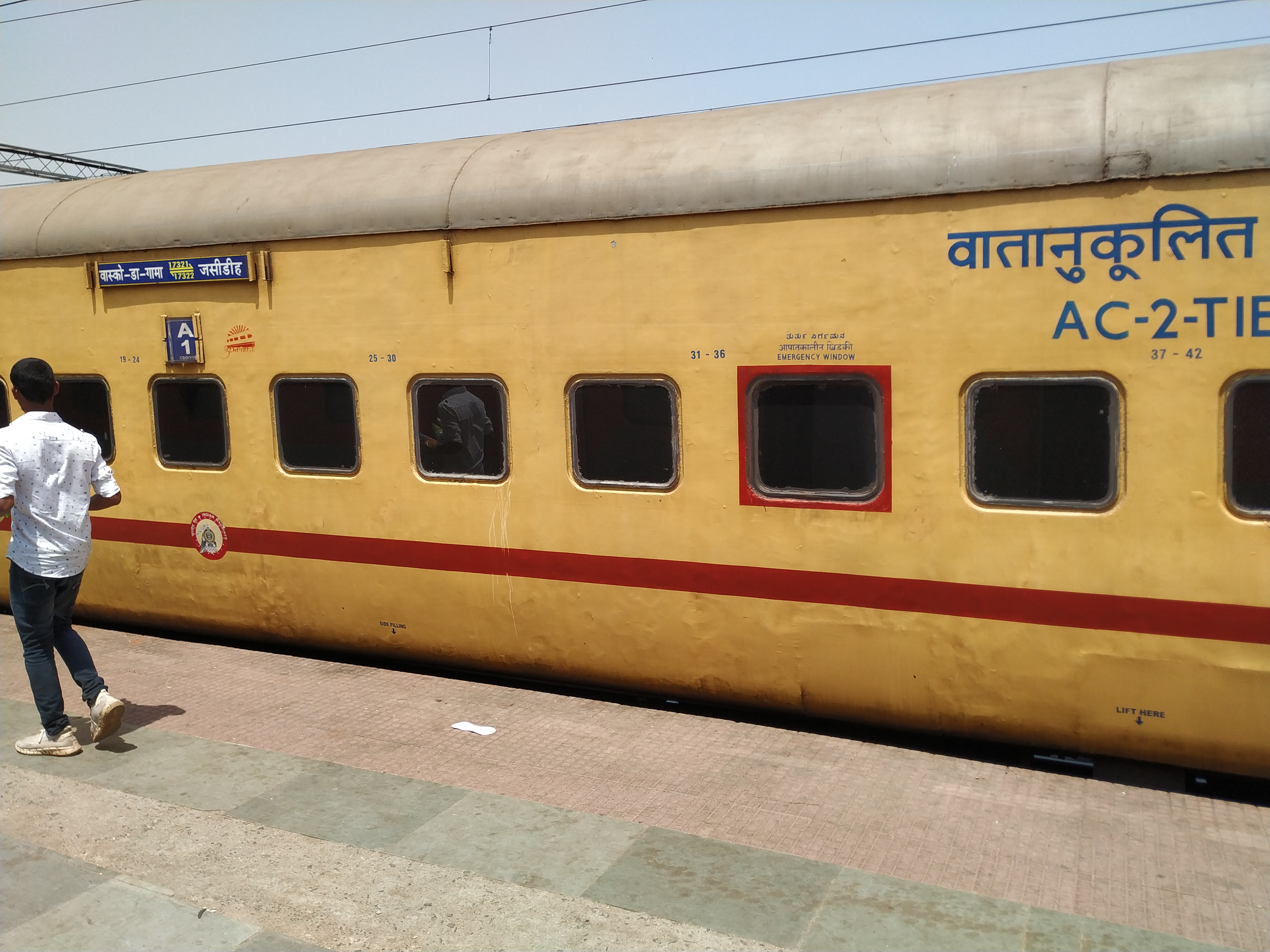

Overview
- Service type: Express
- Status: Operating
- Locale: India
- First service: 28 September 2021
- Current operator: South Western Railway zone

Route
- Termini: Vasco da Gama; Jasidih
- Stops: 35
- Distance travelled: 2595 km (approx.)
- Average journey time: 50 hours (approx.)
- Service frequency: Weekly
- Train number: 17321 / 17322

On-board services
- Classes: AC 2-tier, AC 3-tier, AC 3 Economy, Sleeper Class, General Unreserved
- Seating arrangements: Yes
- Sleeping arrangements: Yes
- Catering facilities: Pantry car

Technical
- Rolling stock: LHB
- Rake maintenance: Vasco-da-Gama
- Rake sharing: No

17321 / 17322 Vasco-da-Gama–Jasidih Weekly Express is a long-distance Express train of the Indian Railways operated by the South Western Railway zone. It connects Vasco-da-Gama in Goa with Jasidih Junction in Jharkhand.

== History ==
The train was introduced to improve long-distance connectivity between the western coastal region of India and the eastern states. The inaugural service of the train commenced from Jasidih on 28 September 2021.

== Route and halts ==
The important commercial halts of the train include:

- Madgaon
- Sanvordem
- Kulem
- Castle Rock
- Londa
- Dharwad
- Hubballi
- Gadag
- Koppal
- Hosapete
- Ballari
- Guntakal
- Raichur
- Vikarabad
- Secunderabad
- Kazipet
- Manchiryal
- Balharshah
- Gondia
- Durg
- Raipur
- Bilaspur
- Jharsuguda
- Rourkela
- Hatia
- Ranchi
- Muri
- Bokaro Steel City
- Chandrapura
- Katrasgarh
- Dhanbad
- Barakar
- Chittaranjan
- Madhupur
- Jasidih.

== Traction and rake ==
The train operates with modern LHB coaches consisting of General Unreserved, Sleeper Class, AC 3-tier, AC 3-tier Economy and AC 2-tier coaches along with a pantry car. The train undergoes locomotive reversal at Guntakal Junction.

== Maintenance ==
Primary rake maintenance is carried out at Vasco-da-Gama coaching depot, while secondary maintenance is undertaken at Madhupur.
