= Maurya Express =

Train in India

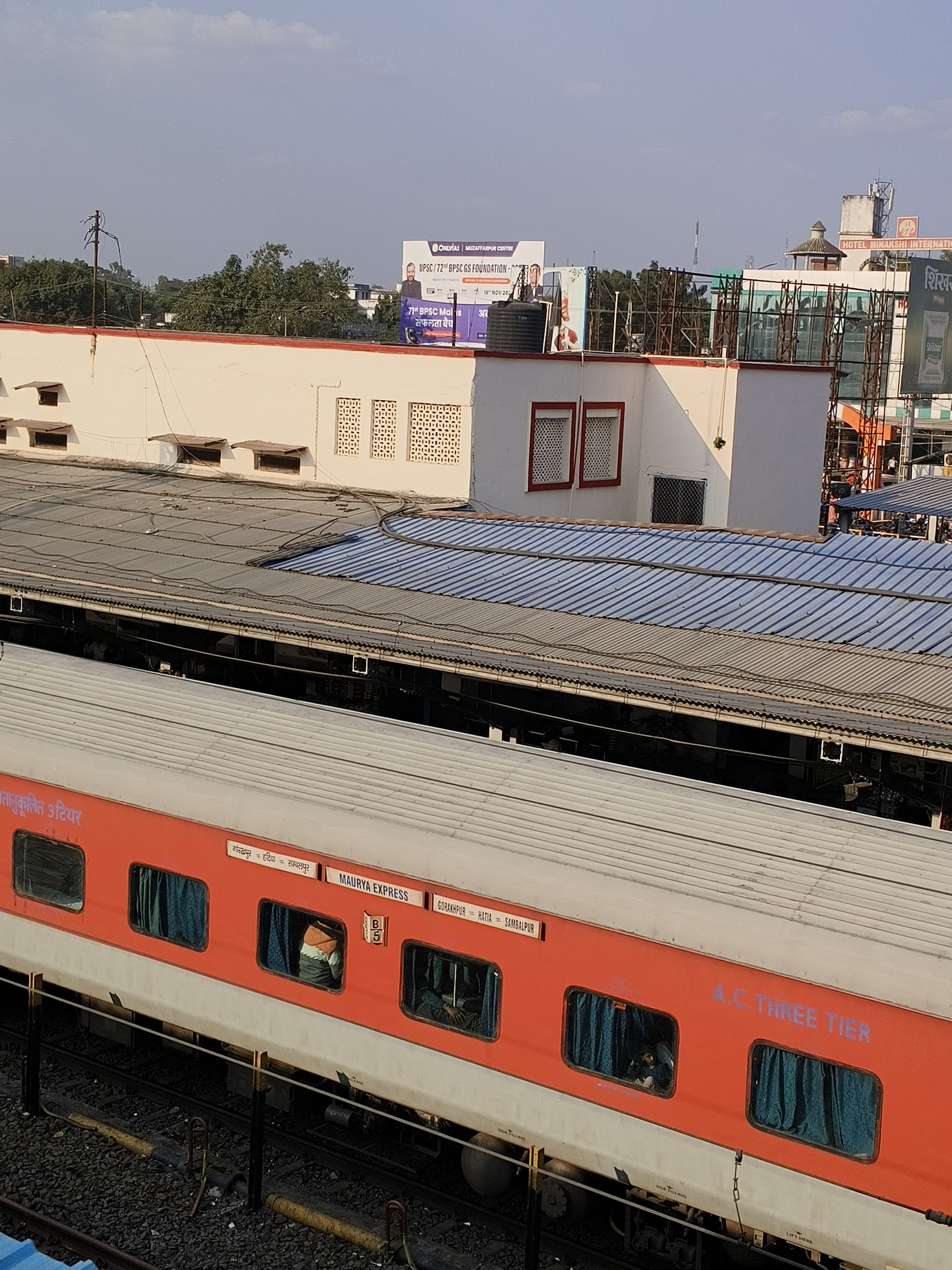
- Maurya Express At Muzaffarpur Junction

Overview
- Service type: Express
- Status: Operating
- First service: 15 July 1976; 49 years ago
- Current operator: North Eastern Railway

Route
- Termini: Sambalpur (SBP); Gorakhpur (GKP)
- Stops: 55
- Distance travelled: 1,164 km (723 mi)
- Average journey time: 31h 10m
- Service frequency: Daily
- Train number: 15027 / 15028

On-board services
- Classes: AC First, AC 2 tier, AC 3 tier, Sleeper Class, General Unreserved
- Seating arrangements: Yes
- Sleeping arrangements: Yes
- Catering facilities: On-board catering E-catering
- Observation facilities: Large windows
- Baggage facilities: No
- Other facilities: Below the seats

Technical
- Rolling stock: LHB coach
- Track gauge: 1,676 mm (5 ft 6 in)
- Electrification: 25 kV at 50 Hz
- Operating speed: 37 km/h (23 mph) average including stops

The 15027 / 15028 Maurya Express is an Express train belonging to North Eastern Railway zone that runs between Sambalpur Junction and Gorakhpur Junction in India. It is currently being operated with 15027/15028 train numbers on a daily basis.

Due to the closure of Dhanbad–Chandrapura line, this train was diverted route to Dhanbad–Netaji Subhas Chandra Bose Gomoh–Chandrapura line. Now it has been restored on its previous route.

== Service ==
The 15027/Maurya Express has an average speed of 36 km/h and covers 851 km in 23h 30m. The 15028/Maurya Express has an average speed of 35 km/h and covers 851 km in 24h 05m.

== History ==
The Maurya Express was originally introduced as the Dhanbad–Muzaffarpur Express, providing rail connectivity between the coalfield region of Dhanbad in Jharkhand and Muzaffarpur in Bihar.

With growing passenger demand, the train was subsequently extended beyond Dhanbad towards the Ranchi region, with its terminal later shifted to Hatia, the principal long-distance rail terminal serving Ranchi. This extension improved connectivity between southern Jharkhand and north Bihar.

In later years, the service was further extended towards Gorakhpur in Uttar Pradesh, establishing a direct long-distance rail link between eastern Uttar Pradesh, Bihar and Jharkhand.

For a certain period, the train was also extended beyond Hatia to Sambalpur in Odisha, thereby providing enhanced inter-state connectivity between Jharkhand and western Odisha. Subsequently, the service was curtailed back to Hatia following operational rationalisation.

The train presently operates as the 15027 / 15028 Maurya Express, continuing to serve as an important Mail/Express train across eastern India.

== Route and stops ==
The important stops of the train are:

- Sambalpur Junction
- Jharsuguda Junction
- Rourkela Junction
- Hatia
- Ranchi Junction
- Muri Junction
- Bokaro Steel City
- Chandrapura
- Dhanbad
- Jasidih
- Jhajha
- Jamui
- Kiul
- Barauni Junction
- Samastipur
- Khudiram Bose Pusa
- Muzaffarpur Junction
- Hajipur
- Sonpur
- Chhapra Junction
- Siwan Junction
- Deoria Sadar
- Chauri Chaura
- Gorakhpur Junction

== Coach composition ==
The train has modern LHB rakes with a maximum speed of 110 km/h. The train consists of 22 coaches:

- 2 AC II Tier (A1 - A2)
- 10 AC III Tier (B1 - B9 and BE1)
- 4 Sleeper coaches (S1 - S4)
- 4 General Unreserved (D1 - D4)
- 1 Divyangjan cum Guard Coach
- 1 Generator Car

== Traction ==
Both trains are hauled by a Gonda Loco Shed based WAP-7 electric locomotive from Sambalpur to Gorakhpur and vice versa.

== Direction reversal ==
Train used to reverse its direction once at;

- Netaji Subhas Chandra Bose Gomoh

But the Chandrapura Junction line has once again resumed. The train does not touch NSC Bose Gomoh any more.

== Coach composition ==
It runs with 4 Sleeper coaches, 3 Second sitting coaches, 10 III AC Coaches, 2 II AC Tier Coach and 1 AC First cum II Tier AC Coach along with 1 Divyangjan Cum Guard Coach & 1 Generator Car.

== See also ==
- Hatia railway station
- Gorakhpur Junction railway station
