= Hatia–Patna Patliputra Express =

Train in India

Patliputra Express
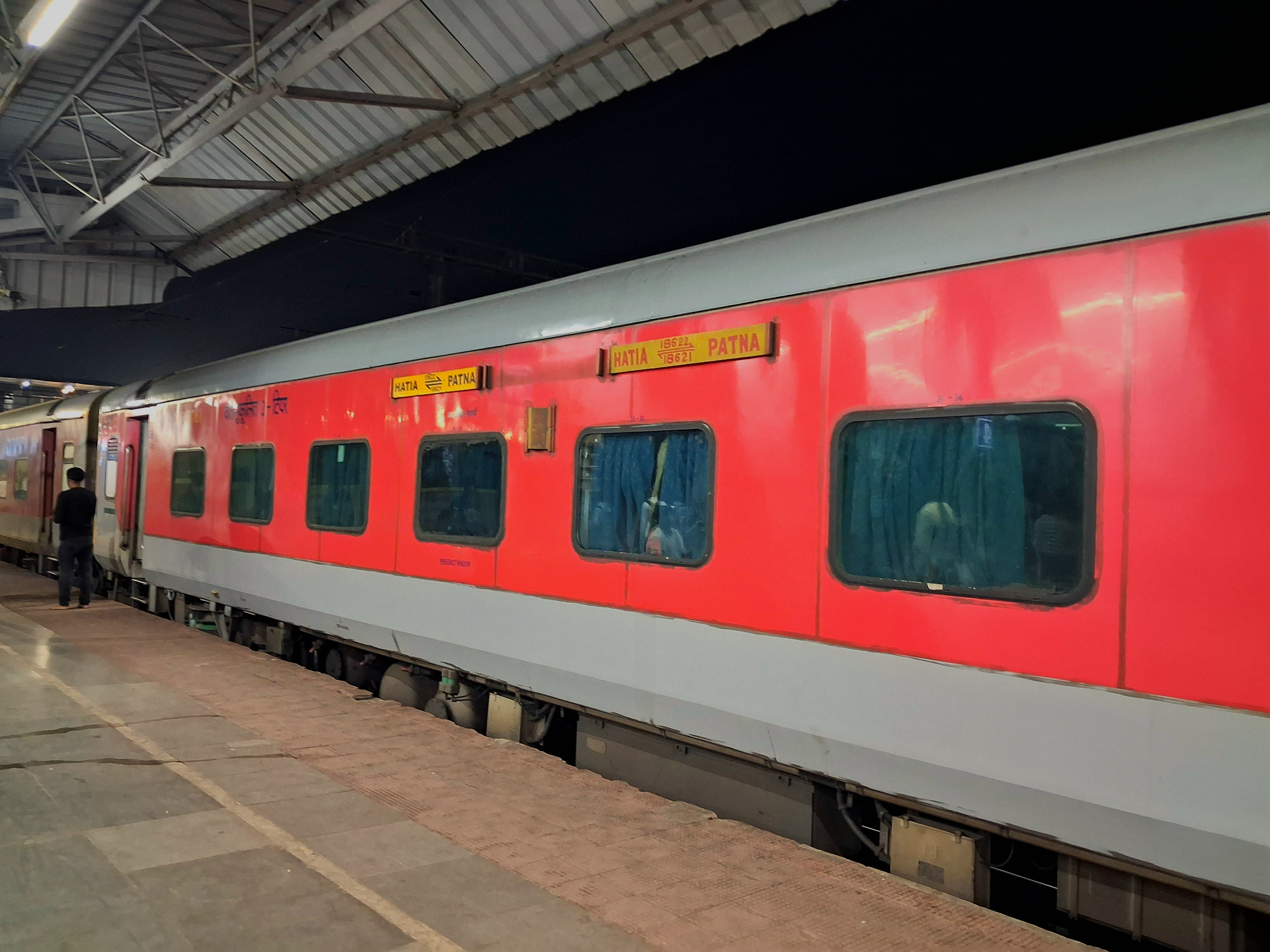
- Hatia–Patna Patliputra Express on a scheduled stop at Madhupur Junction

Overview
- Service type: Express
- Locale: Bihar, West Bengal & Jharkhand
- First service: 1 November 1972; 53 years ago
- Current operator: South Eastern Railway

Route
- Termini: Patna Junction (PNBE); Hatia (HTE)
- Stops: 33
- Distance travelled: 538 km (334 mi)
- Average journey time: 14 hrs 35 mins
- Service frequency: Daily
- Train number: 18621 / 18622

On-board services
- Classes: AC 2 Tier, AC 3 Tier, AC 3 Tier Economy, Sleeper Class, General Unreserved
- Seating arrangements: Yes
- Sleeping arrangements: Yes
- Catering facilities: On-board catering E-catering
- Observation facilities: Large windows
- Baggage facilities: No
- Other facilities: Below the seats

Technical
- Rolling stock: LHB coach
- Track gauge: 1,676 mm (5 ft 6 in)
- Operating speed: 41 km/h (25 mph) average including halts.
Route map
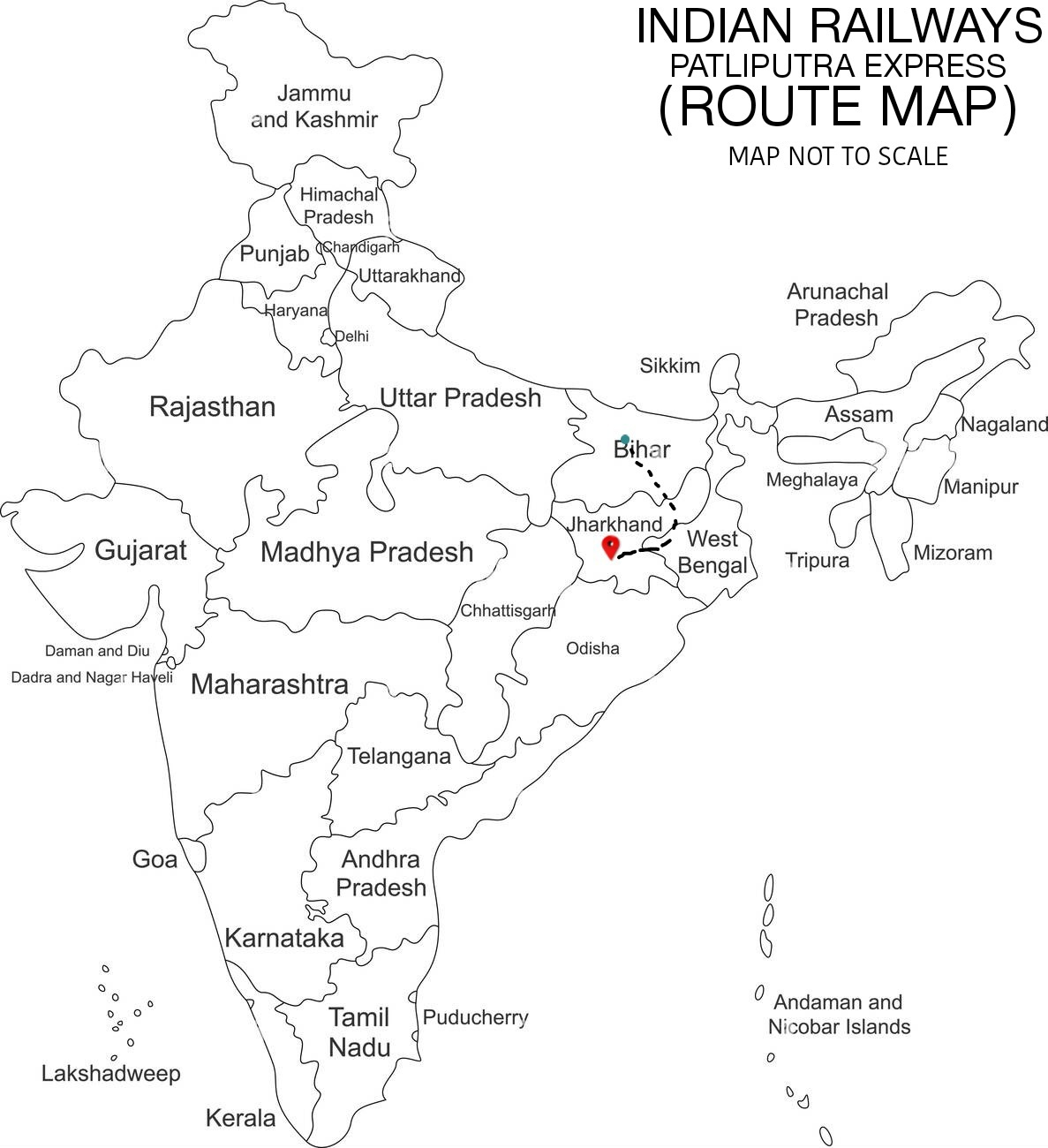

The 18621 / 18622 Patna-Hatia Patliputra Express is an express train belonging to South Eastern Railway zone that runs between Patna Junction and Hatia in India. It is currently being operated with 18621/18622 train numbers on daily basis.It is the oldest train between Ranchi-Patna section.Patliputra Express was launched in 1 November 1972. At that time the train used to start from Dhanbad and used to complete the journey from Dhanbad to Patna with a steam engine.Retired railway employees say that the Patliputra Express was run by a Canadian steam engine WP. At that time only eight to nine coaches were attached. There were no air-conditioned coaches then.

WP was the high speed engine of Indian Railways in the 1960-70s

The WP rail engine that first ran the Patliputra Express was the high-speed engine of Indian Railways in the 1960s and 70s. The same rail engines ran the country's prestigious passenger trains like Taj Express, Grand Trunk Express and other air-conditioned trains. Later, diesel engines and electric engines were used. It used to start from Dhanbad at night and reach Patna via Jasidih and Jhajha. This was the only direct train from Dhanbad to Patna. Before this, Hatia-Patna Express was run on 1 April 1964 to go to Patna. In that train, bogies were attached from Dhanbad and passengers from Dhanbad and nearby areas used to reach Gomo first and then Patna. When Patliputra started running in 1972, the problem of going to Gomo was solved.For 8-10 years, Patliputra Express was the only train from Dhanbad to Patna. Later on 29 November 1980, Ganga-Damodar Express was launched from Dhanbad to Patna. A few months after the launch of Ganga-Damodar Express, Pataliputra Express was extended to Ranchi. Then it started running from Hatia to Patna. The train connecting Jharkhand and Bihar is still popular among passengers.

== Service ==
The 18621/Patliputra Express has an average speed of 41 km/h and covers 538 km in 13h 45m. The 18622/Patliputra Express has an average speed of 39 km/h and covers 538 km in 14h 35m.

== Route & Halts ==
The Total halts of the train are:

- Patna Junction
- Rajendra Nagar Terminal
- Patna Sahib
- Fatuha Junction
- Khusropur
- Bakhtiyarpur Junction
- Barh
- Mokama
- Hathidah Junction
- Barhiya
- Lakhisarai Junction
- Kiul Junction
- Mananpur
- Jamui
- Gidhaur
- Jhajha
- Simultala
- Telwa Bazar
- Jasidih Junction
- Shankarpur
- Madhupur Junction
- Vidyasagar
- Jamtara
- Chittaranjan
- Kulti
- Barakar
- Kumardubi
- Dhanbad Junction
- Chandrapura Junction
- Bokaro Steel City
- Muri Junction
- Ranchi Junction
- Hatia

== Coach composition ==
The train has LHB rakes with a running speed of 130 kmph. The train consists of 21 coaches :

- 2 AC II Tier
- 5 AC III Tier
- 1 AC Economy
- 7 Sleeper Coaches
- 4 General Unreserved
- 1 Seating cum Luggage Rake
- 1 EOG
- Coach Composition Of 18621

ENG<SLR<GEN<GEN<S7<S6<S5<S4<S3<S2<S1<M1<B1<B2<B3<B4<B5<A1<A2<GEN<GEN<EOG

- Coach Composition Of 18622

ENG<EOG<GEN<GEN<A1<A2<B1<B2<B3<B4<B5<M1<S1<S2<S3<S4<S5<S6<S7<GEN<GEN<SLR

From 20/05/2025 (HTE-PNBE)

== Traction ==
Both trains are hauled by a Tuglakabad based WAP-7 electric locomotive from Patna to Hatia.

== See also ==
- Patna Junction railway station
- Hatia railway station
- Patna–Hatia Express
- Patna–Hatia Super Express
