= Krishak Express =

Train in India

Overview
- Service type: Express
- Locale: Uttar Pradesh
- Current operator: North Eastern Railway

Route
- Termini: Varanasi City (BCY); Lucknow Junction (LJN)
- Stops: 27
- Distance travelled: 504 km (313 mi)
- Average journey time: 13 hours 05 minutes
- Service frequency: Daily
- Train number: 15007 / 15008

On-board services
- Classes: AC First Class, AC 2 Tier, AC 3 Tier, Sleeper Class, General unreserved
- Seating arrangements: Yes
- Sleeping arrangements: Yes
- Catering facilities: E-Catering available
- Observation facilities: Large windows
- Baggage facilities: No
- Other facilities: Below the seats

Technical
- Rolling stock: ICF coach
- Track gauge: 1,676 mm (5 ft 6 in)
- Operating speed: 55 km/h (34 mph) average including halts.
Route map
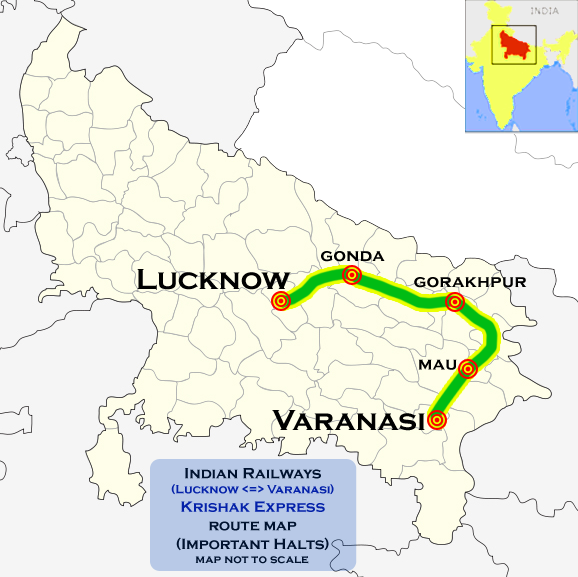

The 15007 / 15008 Krishak Express is an Indian Railways train of North Eastern Railway zone. It operates daily and covers a distance of 513 kilometres (319 mi) from Varanasi City to Lucknow Junction. Krishak Express reaches Lucknow Junction via Gorakhpur with total travel time of 12 Hours 45 Minutes while it completes the return journey to Varanasi City in 13 Hours 25 Minutes.

15007 - Starts Varanasi City at 17:00 Hrs and reach Lucknow Junction on 2nd day at 5:45 Hrs

15008 - Starts Lucknow Junction at 23:10 Hrs and reach Varanasi City on 2nd day at 12:35 Hrs

== Important Stops ==
Varanasi City, Sarnath, Aunrihar Junction,Sadat Mau Junction, Bhatni Junction, Salempur Junction, Deoria Sadar, Chauri Chaura, Gorakhpur Junction, Basti, Babhnan, Gonda Junction, Barabanki Junction, Gomti Nagar, Lucknow City, Lucknow Junction

== Reservation ==
People have to take an advanced reservation ticket to travel in the train except for the General class. Tatkal ticketing facility is also available for this train.

In October 2014, the train was involved in an accident that killed 14 and injured 50.

== Coach composition ==
The coach composition of the 15007 train is:

- 1 AC I Tier + II Tier (Hybrid)
- 1 AC II Tier
- 3 AC III Tier
- 8 Sleeper Coaches
- 6 General
- 2 Second-class Luggage/parcel van

Loco	1	2	3	4	5	6	7	8	9	10	11	12	13	14	15	16	17	18	19	20	21	22
	GRD	GEN	GEN	GEN	S1	S2	S3	S4	S5	S6	S7	S8	B1	B2	A1	A2	HA1	GEN	GEN	GEN	GEN	SLR
