= Sainthia train collision =

2010 rail disaster in India

Details
- Date: 19 July 2010; 02:00 (IST, UTC+05:30)
- Location: Sainthia Junction railway station, Sainthia, Birbhum, West Bengal
- Country: India
- Operator: Indian Railways
- Incident type: Rear-end collision

Statistics
- Trains: 2 * Uttar Banga Express * Vananchal Express
- Vehicles: 2 diesel locomotives WDM-2 and WDG-3A
- Deaths: 66
- Injured: 165

The Sainthia train collision occurred on 19 July 2010, at the Sainthia Junction railway station in Sainthia, India, when the Uttar Banga Express collided with the Vananchal Express as the latter was leaving the platform. 66 people died as a result of the accident, and 165 were reported injured.

== Collision ==
The collision occurred 191 km from Kolkata at 02:00 am (IST) when the Uttar Banga Express, travelling from New Cooch Behar to Sealdah, hit the Bhagalpur – Ranchi Vananchal Express which was just leaving Sainthia railway station. The impact destroyed the 3 rear compartments of the Vananchal Express.

The injured were sent to hospitals in Sainthia and Suri. The Home Minister stressed the need for a much faster response to such accidents.

== Investigation ==
Railway officials initially described how there may have been something wrong with the drivers of the Uttar Banga Express, detailing how the train had passed through a red signal at high speed, with no evidence of a brake application and with no apparent attempt by the driver or co-driver to jump clear of the train cab before the collision. Both were found dead in the wreckage, still in their seats. The possibility of the two drivers of Uttar Banga Express being drugged had triggered alarm in the railways. However, the post mortem of the drivers at the Suri hospital did not show any evidence of drugs. As a precaution, drivers and guards have been asked not to buy any food or drink at stations.

Sainthia railway station was a scheduled stop for the express, but the train is believed to have passed over a bridge 1.2 km before the accident at three times the line speed. The crew had taken charge of the train at Malda Town 5 hours before the accident, and had appeared fit and well to station staff during a previous unscheduled stop at Gadadharpur, 7 km ahead of the accident site. The signalman in-charge at the station claimed to have heard the station master trying to alert the driver of the Uttar Banga Express via walkie-talkie, but got no response.

The enquiry has found no fault with the train's brakes although, the guard, when questioned said that he had applied the emergency brake after the driver did not respond to him on the walkie-talkie, but the brake failed. Also there was no signal failure, the approach signal was red. Probable causal factors found are the drugging of the drivers and not setting a diversion route when the Vananchal Express was standing at the platform. It was too late to operate points and divert the train when the Uttar Banga Express was seen.

The driver of the Vananchal Express, said that "even though the green signal was given at 1:54 a.m., we could start the train only at 2:01 a.m. because we had not received any signal from the guard".

== Compensation ==
Railway Minister Mamata Banerjee has announced compensation of a total of ₹500,000 for the dead, ₹100,000 for the seriously injured, and ₹25,000 for minor injuries.

== See also ==
- List of Indian rail incidents
