= Secunderabad–Darbhanga Express =

Train in India

Overview
- Service type: Express
- First service: 14 July 2012; 12 years ago
- Current operator(s): South Central Railway

Route
- Termini: Secunderabad (SC); Darbhanga (DBG)
- Stops: 25
- Distance travelled: 1,917 km (1,191 mi)
- Average journey time: 39 hrs 45 mins
- Service frequency: Bi-weekly
- Train number(s): 17007 / 17008

On-board services
- Class(es): AC 2 tier, AC 3 tier, Sleeper class, General Unreserved
- Seating arrangements: Yes
- Sleeping arrangements: Yes
- Catering facilities: On-board catering, E-catering
- Observation facilities: Large windows
- Baggage facilities: No
- Other facilities: Below the seats

Technical
- Rolling stock: ICF coach
- Track gauge: 1,676 mm (5 ft 6 in)
- Operating speed: 49 km/h (30 mph) average including halts.
Route map
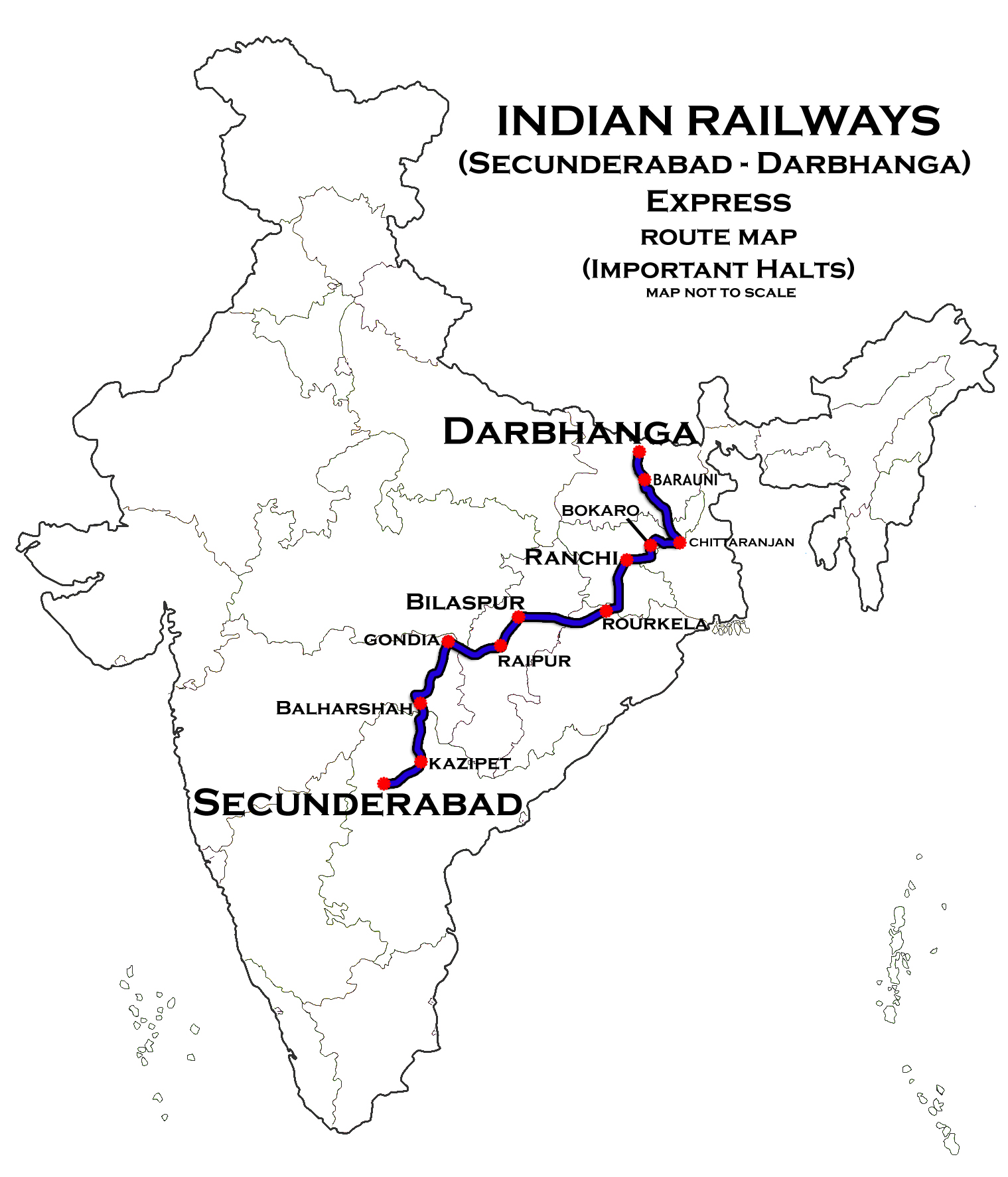

The 17007 / 17008 Secunderabad–Darbhanga Express is a Superfast Express trains in India train belonging to South Central Railway zone that runs between Secunderabad Junction and Darbhanga in India. It is currently being operated with 17007/17008 train numbers on bi-weekly basis. The train was cancelled due to closure of Dhanbad–Chandrapura line. As the train service between Dhanbad and Chandrapura line is resumed, this train is restored and will follow its older route from 2 July 2019 as 17007 Secunderabad Darbhanga Express and from 5 July 2019 as 17008 Darbhanga Secunderabad Express with slightly modified timetable.

== Service ==
The 17007/Secunderabad–Darbhanga Express has an average speed of 51 km/h and covers 1917 km in 39h 5m. The 17008/Darbhanga–Secunderabad Express has an average speed of 52 km/h and covers 1917 km in 39h 5m.

== Route and halts ==
The important halts of the train are:

- Secunderabad Junction
- Kazipet Junction
- Balharshah Junction
- Arjuni
- Gondia Junction
- Durg Junction
- Raipur Junction
- Bilaspur Junction
- Rourkela Junction
- Ranchi Junction
- Muri Junction
- Bokaro Steel City
- Dhanbad Junction
- Jhajha
- Kiul Junction
- Barauni Junction
- Samastipur Junction
- Darbhanga Junction

== Coach composition ==
The train has standard ICF rakes with a maximum speed of 110 km/h. The train consists of 21 coaches:

- 2 AC II Tier
- 4 AC III Tier
- 10 Sleeper coaches
- 5 General Unreserved
- 2 Seating cum Luggage Rake

== Traction ==
The route is fully electrified, both trains are hauled by a Lallaguda Loco Shed-based WAP-7 or Vijayawada Loco Shed-based WAP-4 electric locomotive from Secunderabad to Darbhanga and vice versa.

== See also ==
- Darbhanga Junction railway station
- Dhanbad–Chandrapura line
- Secunderabad Junction railway station
- Seven Hills Express
- Tirupati–Karimnagar Superfast Express
