= Howrah–Ranchi Shatabdi Express =

Train in India

Howrah Junction – Ranchi Junction Shatabdi Express
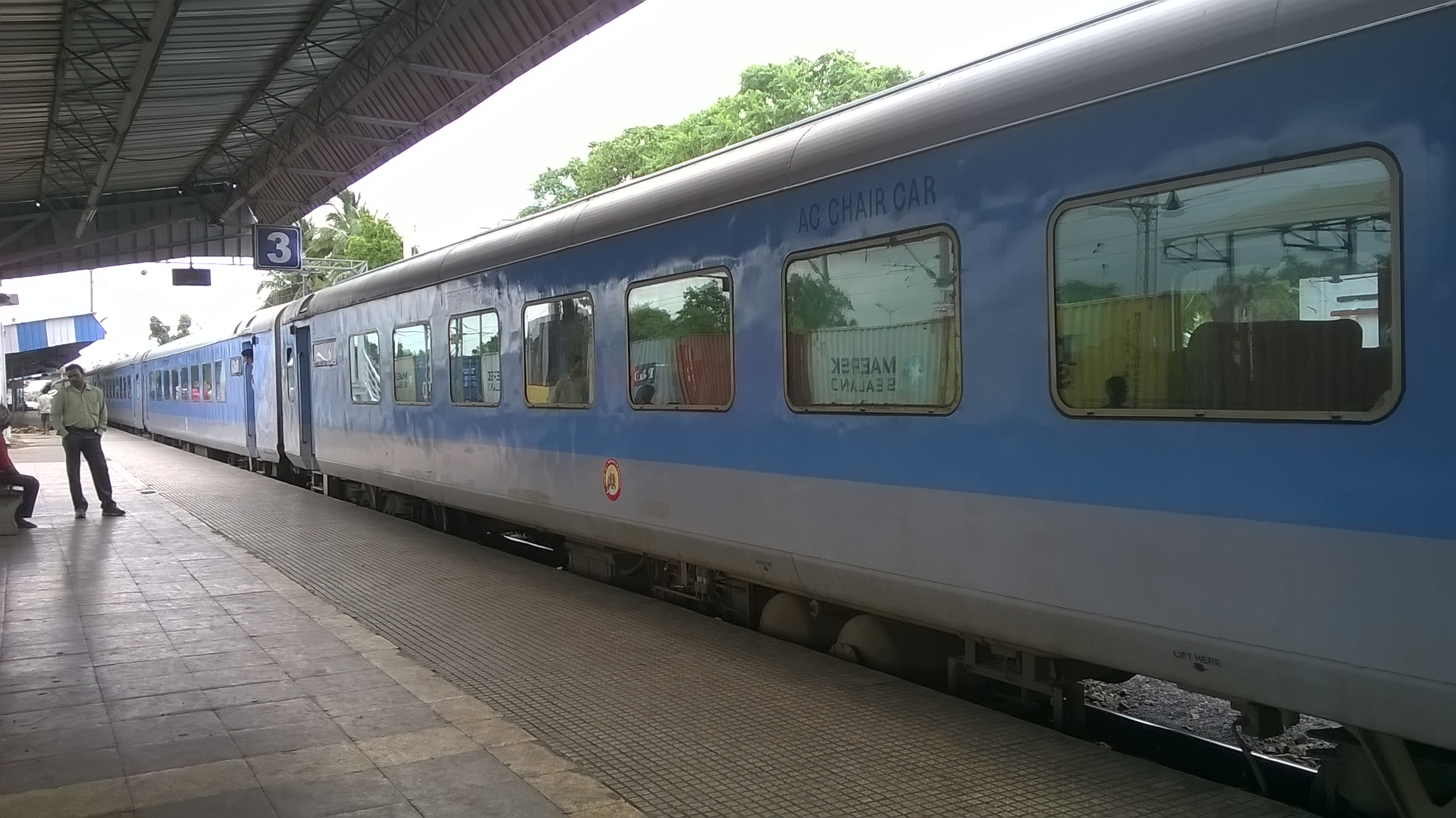
- Howrah - Ranchi Shatabdi Express standing at Durgapur Railway Station

Overview
- Service type: Shatabdi Express
- First service: 4 July 1995
- Current operator: Eastern Railways

Route
- Termini: Howrah Junction; Ranchi Junction
- Stops: 7
- Distance travelled: 425.724 km (265 mi) towards Ranchi, 420.800 km (261 mi) towards Howrah (Chargeable distance may be different at least one direction)
- Service frequency: 6 days a week (Note: Except Sundays)
- Train number: 12019 / 12020

On-board services
- Classes: Executive Class, AC Chair Car
- Seating arrangements: Yes
- Sleeping arrangements: No
- Catering facilities: No pantry car attached but available
- Observation facilities: LHB coach
- Baggage facilities: Overhead racks

Technical
- Rolling stock: Standard Indian Railways LHB Shatabdi coaches
- Track gauge: 1,676 mm (5 ft 6 in)
- Operating speed: The maximum permissible speed is 130 km/h (81 mph) between Howrah and Dhanbad and the overall average speed taking both directions is 56.75 km/h (35 mph)

The Howrah–Ranchi Junction Shatabdi Express is a Shatabdi category train of Indian Railways that connects the capital of West Bengal, Kolkata with the capital of Jharkhand, Ranchi. The train belongs to the Howrah Division of Eastern Railways and runs on all the days, except on Sundays.

The train was announced in the railway budget for the fiscal year 1995-96 and subsequently commenced its maiden journey from Howrah Junction on 4 July 1995. On 28 October 2001, the 2019 UP / 2020 DN (number of that time) Howrah – Bokaro Steel City Shatabdi Express had its route extended to Ranchi.

== Service ==
The current 12019 / 12020 Howrah – Ranchi Shatabdi Express departs from Howrah Junction at 06:05 hrs and arrives in Ranchi Junction at 13:15 hrs.. On its return trip, the Howrah bound Shatabdi Express departs from Ranchi Junction at 13:45 hrs and arrives in Howrah Junction at 21:30 hrs. The maximum permissible speed of the train in both the direction is 130 km/h.

== Coach composition, route and stoppages ==
The train is equipped with LHB coaches and consists of two AC Executive Class (E1 and E2), seven AC Chair Car (C1 to C7) and two End on Generation / Power Cars. The train takes the Howrah - Delhi route till Dhanbad and then takes the Dhanbad - Chandrapura route to reach Ranchi.

En-route between Howrah and Ranchi, the train stops at the following stations;

- Durgapur
- Raniganj Junction
- Asansol Junction
- Dhanbad Junction
- Chandrapura Junction
- Bokaro Steel City Junction
- Muri Junction

== Coach positioning ==
Coach positioning for 12019 Howarh Ranchi Shatabdi Express is:

LOCO-EOG-C1-C2-C3-C4-C5-C6-C7-E1-E2-EOG

Vice versa Coach positioning at Ranchi Junction.

== Loco link ==
As the route is fully electrified, a Howrah-based WAP-5 / WAP-7 powers the train for its entire journey.
