= Vananchal Express =

Train in India

Overview
- Service type: Express
- First service: 15 July 2000; 25 years ago
- Current operator: Eastern Railway

Route
- Termini: Ranchi Junction (RNC); Bhagalpur Junction (BGP)
- Stops: 24
- Distance travelled: 553 km (344 mi)
- Average journey time: 12h 55m
- Service frequency: Daily (Note: Runs seven days in a week for every direction.)
- Train number: 13403 / 13404

On-board services
- Classes: AC 2 tier, AC 3 tier, Sleeper class, General Unreserved
- Seating arrangements: Yes
- Sleeping arrangements: Yes
- Catering facilities: On-board catering, E-catering
- Observation facilities: Large windows
- Baggage facilities: No
- Other facilities: Below the seats

Technical
- Rolling stock: LHB coach
- Track gauge: 1,676 mm (5 ft 6 in)
- Operating speed: 43 km/h (27 mph) average including halts

The 13403 / 13404 Vananchal Express is an Express train belonging to Eastern Railway zone that runs between Ranchi Junction and Bhagalpur Junction via Dhanbad, Rampurhat in India. It is currently being operated with 13403/13404 train numbers on a daily basis. this train is also remembered for the infamous Sainthia train collision.

== Service ==
The 13403/Vananchal Express was inaugurated on 15 July 2000. It has an average speed of 39 km/h and covers 553 km in 14h 15m. The 13404/Vananchal Express has an average speed of 41 km/h and covers 556 km in 13h 30m.

== Route & halts ==
The important halts of the train are:

- Ranchi Junction
- Muri Junction
- Bokaro Steel City
- Chandrapura Junction
- Dhanbad Junction
- Asansol Junction
- Raniganj
- Andal Junction
- Pandabeswar
- Siuri
- Sainthia Junction
- Rampurhat Junction
- Nalhati Junction
- Murarai
- Pakur
- Gumani
- Barharwa Junction
- Tinpahar Junction
- Sahibganj Junction
- Mirza Cheuki
- Pirpainti
- Kahalgaon
- Ghogha
- Bhagalpur Junction.

Note: Bold letters indicates Major Railway Stations/Major Cities.

== Coach composition ==
The train has standard swanky LHB rakes upgraded under LHB Scheme with max speed of 110 kmph. The train consists of 19 coaches :

- 1 AC Coach
- 2 AC II Tier
- 3 AC III Tier
- 7 Sleeper coaches
- 4 General
- 2 Seating cum Luggage Rake

== Traction ==
earlier was WDM-2. Both trains are hauled by an Howrah Loco Shed-based WAP-4 electric locomotive from Ranchi to Bhagalpur and vice versa.

== Direction Reversal ==
The train reverses its direction once at:

- Andal Junction.

== Accidents ==
The Sainthia train collision occurred on 19 July 2010, at the Sainthia Junction railway station in Sainthia, India, when the Uttar Banga Express collided with the Vananchal Express as the latter was leaving the platform. 66 people died as a result of the accident, and 165 were reported injured.

== See also ==
- Ranchi Junction railway station
- Bhagalpur Junction railway station
- Sainthia train collision
