= Dhanbad–Ranchi Intercity Express =

Dhanbad Junction – Ranchi Junction Intercity Express
Overview
- Service type: Express
- Status: Operating
- First service: Inauguration on June 14, 2001
- Current operator: East Central Railway zone

Route
- Termini: Dhanbad Junction; Ranchi Junction
- Stops: 6
- Distance travelled: 162 km (101 mi)
- Average journey time: 4 hours 20 mins
- Service frequency: Daily
- Train number: 13303 / 13304

On-board services
- Classes: 14 general unreserved and 1 AC
- Seating arrangements: Yes
- Sleeping arrangements: No
- Catering facilities: No
- Baggage facilities: Yes

Technical
- Rolling stock: LHB
- Track gauge: 1,676 mm (5 ft 6 in)
- Operating speed: 62.5 km/h (39 mph)
- Depot: DHN CDO
- Rake maintenance: Dhanbad Jn
- Rake sharing: 13319/20 Ranchi – Dumka Intercity Express

The 13303 / 04 Dhanbad Junction – Ranchi Junction Intercity Express is an Express train belonging to Indian Railways East Central Railway zone that runs between Dhanbad Junction and Ranchi Junction in India.

It operates as train number 13303 from Dhanbad Junction to Ranchi Junction and train number 13304 in the reverse direction serving the states of Jharkhand.

== Halts ==
Dhanbad Jn

[[Katrasgarh]]

Phulwartanr

Chandrapura Jn.

Bokaro Steel City

Jhalida

Muri

Ranchi

== Coaches ==
The 13303 / 04 Dhanbad Junction – Ranchi Junction Intercity Express has ten general unreserved & two SLR (seating with luggage rake) coaches . It does not carry a pantry car coach.

As is customary with most train services in India, coach composition may be amended at the discretion of Indian Railways depending on demand.

== Service ==
The 13303 Dhanbad Junction – Ranchi Junction Intercity Express covers the distance of 165 km (103 mi) in 4 hours 00 mins (41 km/h) and in 4 hours 05 mins as the 13304 Ranchi Junction – Dhanbad Junction Intercity Express (40 km/h).

The average speed is 37 km/h (23 mph), as per railway rules, its fare doesn't include a Superfast surcharge.

== Routing ==
The 13303 / 13304 Intercity Express runs from Dhanbad Junction via Bokaro Steel City, Muri Junction to Ranchi Junction.

In between 2017 and 2019 it was diverted to run via Dhanbad – Asansol – Joy Chandi – Bhojudih- Chandrapura due to closing of Dhanbad–Chandrapura line.

== Traction ==
As the route is electrified, a Mughalsarai Junction based WAP-4 electric locomotive pulls the train to its destination.
