= Dhanbad–Sasaram Intercity Express =

Passenger train in India

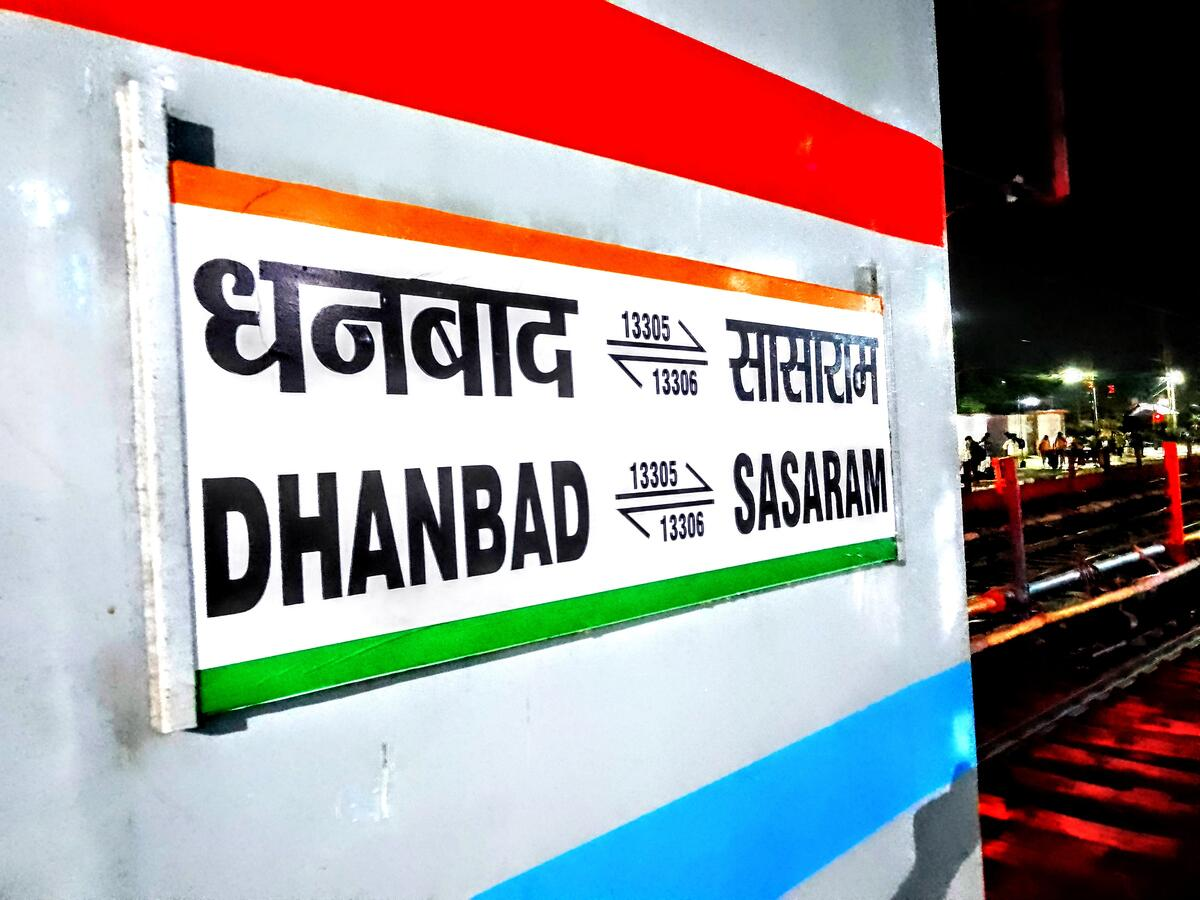

Overview
- Service type: Express
- Current operator: East Central Railway zone

Route
- Termini: Dhanbad Junction; Sasaram junction
- Stops: 31
- Distance travelled: 302 km (188 mi)
- Average journey time: 7 hours 20 mins
- Service frequency: Daily
- Train number: 13305 / 13306

On-board services
- Class: Unreserved | AC Chair
- Seating arrangements: Yes
- Sleeping arrangements: No
- Catering facilities: No
- Baggage facilities: Yes

Technical
- Rolling stock: LHB
- Track gauge: 1,676 mm (5 ft 6 in)
- Operating speed: 41 km/h (25 mph)
- Rake maintenance: Dhanbad Jn
- Rake sharing: No

The 13305 / 13306 Dhanbad–Sasaram Intercity Express is an express train belonging to Indian Railways East Central Railway zone that runs between Dhanbad Junction and Sasaram Junction in India. The train was extended from Gaya Junction to Dehri On Sone railway station in 2022 then to Sasaram junction in 2023.

It operates as train number 13305 fron Dhanbad Junction to Sasaram Junction railway station and as train number 13306 in the reverse direction serving the states of Jharkhand and Bihar.

== Coaches ==
The 13305 / 06 Dhanbad–Sasaram Intercity Express has 14 unreserved coach, 1 AC Chair car, one EOG and one SLR (seating with luggage rake) coaches . It does not carry a pantry car coach.

As is customary with most train services in India, coach composition may be amended at the discretion of Indian Railways depending on demand.

== Service ==
The 13305 Dhanbad Junction - Sasaram Intercity Express covers the distance of 302 km (188 mi) in 7 hours 20 mins (41 km/h) and in 7 hours 00 mins as the 13306 Sasaram - Dhanbad Junction Intercity Express (43 km/h).

As the average speed of the train is lower than 55 km/h (34 mph), as per railway rules, its fare doesn't includes a Superfast surcharge.

== Routing ==
The 13305 / 13306 Dhanbad - Sasaram Junction Intercity Express runs from Dhanbad Junction via

- Tetulmari
- Netaji Subhas Chandra Bose Gomoh
- Nimiaghat
- Parasnath
- Chichaki
- Hazaribagh Road
- Chaube
- Parsabad
- Sarmatanr
- Hirodih
- Koderma Junction
- Gujhandi
- Dilwa
- Nathganj
- Baskatwa B. H.
- Gurpa
- Paharpur
- Tankuppa
- Gaya Junction
- Kastha
- Paraiya
- Guraru
- Ismailpur
- Rafiganj
- Jakhim
- Baghoi Kusa
- Phesar
- Anugraha Narayan Road
- Son Nagar Junction
- Dehri-on-Sone railway station
- Karwandia
- Sasaram Junction

== Traction ==
As the route is electrified, a Mughalsarai Junction based WAP-7 electric locomotive pulls the train to its destination.
