= Bhelatand =

Region in Jharkhand, India

Coordinates: 23.77°N 86.32°E

Bhelatand is a region located between Dhanbad and Bokaro in the Jharkhand state of India. This region is known for being rich in coal. The Tata Group Bheltand Washery and Colliery are located in the region, with the colliery known to be over 100 years old.
