= Kulti railway station =

Railway station in West Bengal, India

Kulti
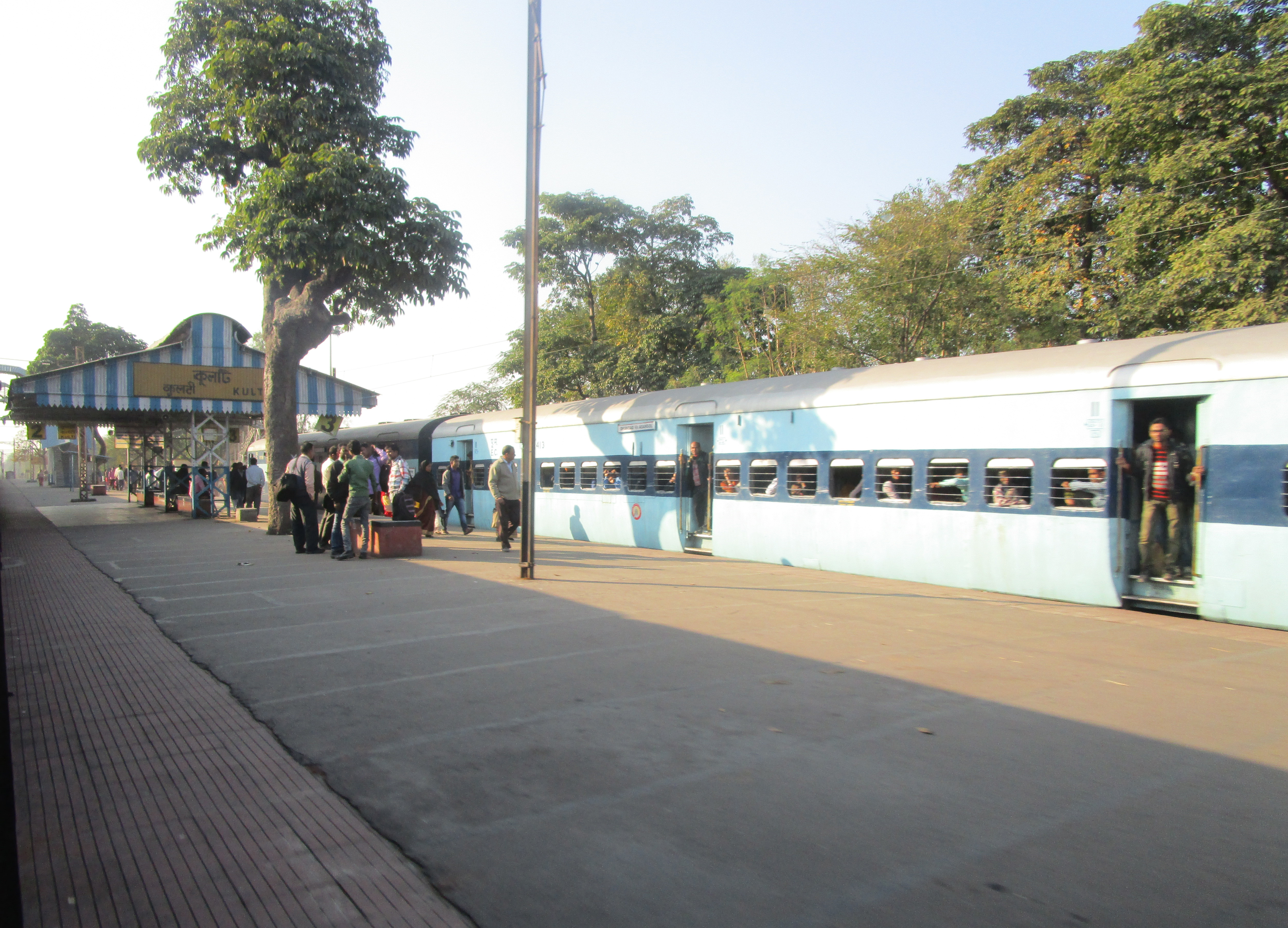
- Kulti railway station

General information
- Location: Kulti, West Bengal; India
- Coordinates: 23.739154°N 86.848455°E
- Elevation: 144 m (472 ft)
- System: Indian Railways station
- Owner: Indian Railways
- Operator: Eastern Railway
- Lines: Asansol–Gaya section, Grand Chord, Howrah–Gaya–Delhi line, Howrah–Prayagraj–Mumbai line
- Platforms: 3
- Tracks: 2 (double electrified broad gauge)

Construction
- Structure type: Standard (on ground station)

Other information
- Status: Functioning
- Station code: ULT
- Zone(s): Eastern Railway
- Division(s): Asansol
Location
- Location within West Bengal Location within India

Kulti railway station is a railway station at Kulti in Paschim Bardhaman district, West Bengal. Its code is ULT. It serves Kulti , a neighborhood in Asansol. The station consists of three platforms.

== History ==
The first train in Bengal ran on 6 July 1854 Howrah to Pundooah and back. In 1855, East India Railwa’s "experimental" track for a Calcutta-Delhi route now consisted of the Howrah to Raneegunje (Raniganj, collieries near Asansol) section of 121 miles. The line was extended to Barakar in 1871.

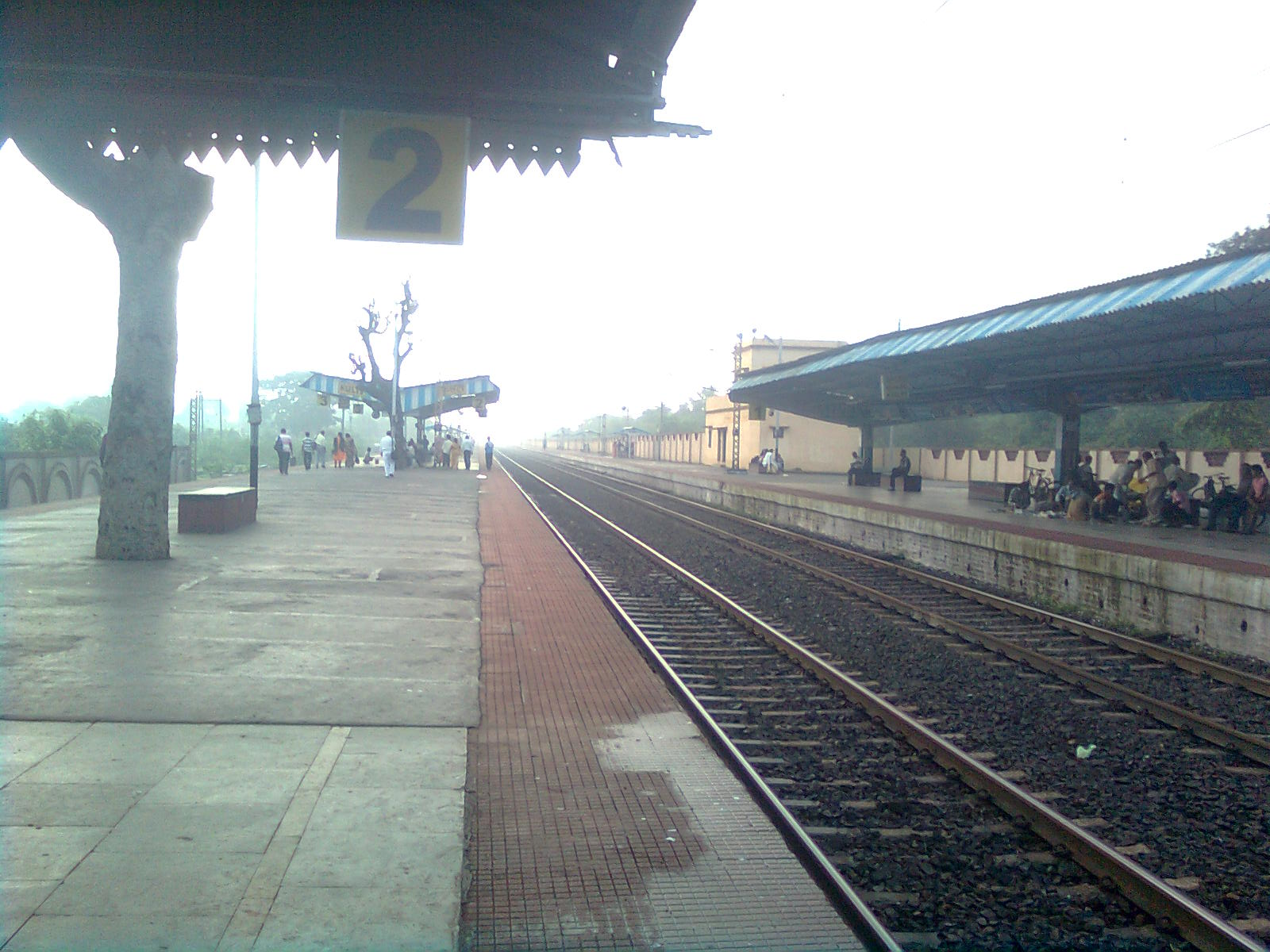
Kulti railway station

== Major trains ==
Some of the important trains that run from Kulti are:
• Patliputra Express
• Dhanbad–Patna Intercity Express
• Coalfield Express
• Black Diamond Express
• Jammu Tawi - Kolkata Express
• Shaktipunj Express
• Asansol - NSCB Jn. Gomoh MEMU
• Varanasi-Asansol MEMU Express
• Barddhaman - Hatia MEMU Express (UnReserved)
• Barkakana - Asansol MEMU
