= Telwa Bazar Halt railway station =

Railway station in Bihar, India

Telwa Bazar Halt
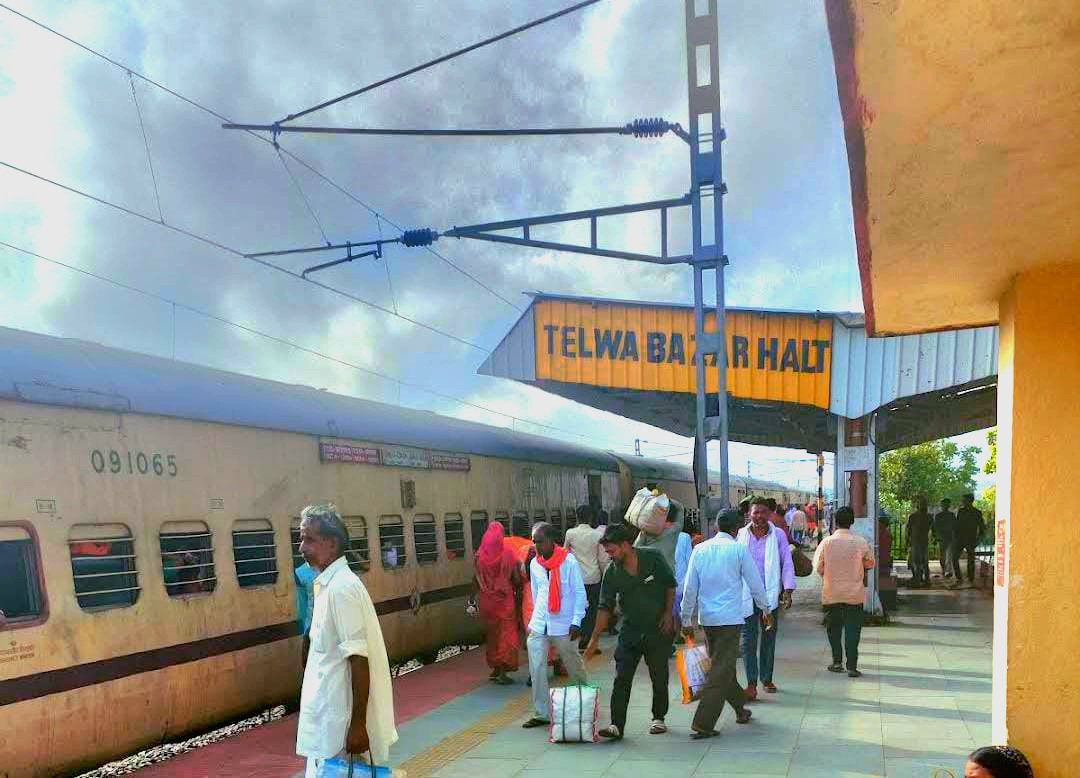
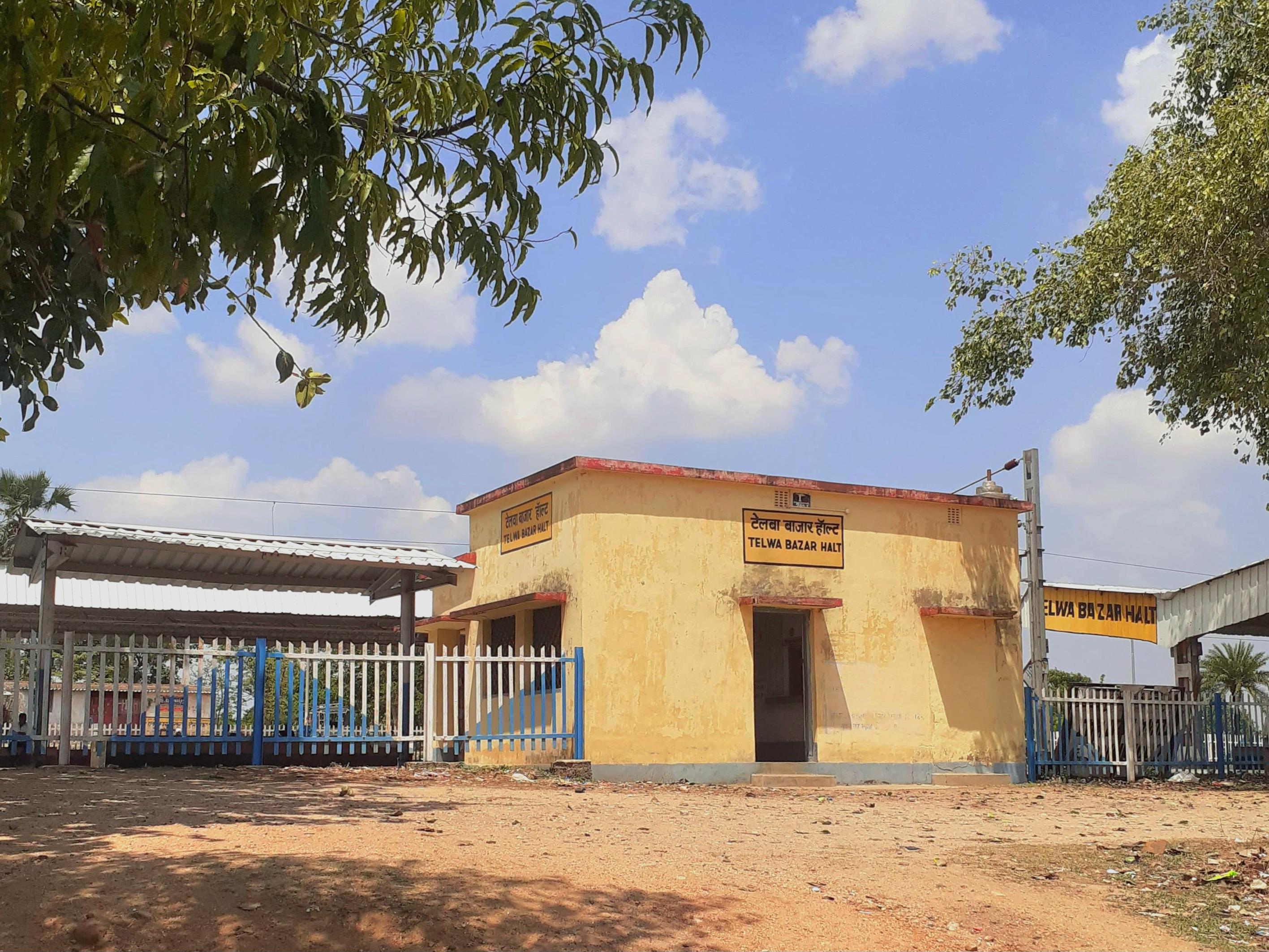
- Platform shed (above) and station building with ticket counter (below) at Telwa Bazar Halt railway station.

General information
- Location: Telwa Bazar, Jamui district, Bihar; India
- Coordinates: 24.69427°N 86.55695°E
- Elevation: 243 m (797 ft)
- System: Indian Railways station
- Owner: Indian Railways
- Operator: Eastern Railway
- Line: Asansol–Patna section of Howrah–Delhi main line
- Platforms: 2
- Tracks: Broad gauge

Construction
- Structure type: Standard (on ground station)
- Parking: Yes

Other information
- Status: Active
- Station code: TLB
- Zone(s): Eastern Railway
- Classification: HG-2

History
- Electrified: 1996–97
- Former names: East Indian Railway
Route map
Location
- Location within Bihar
- Interactive map

Telwa Bazar Halt railway station (station code: TLB) is a railway station on Howrah–New Delhi main line operated by Eastern Railway zone of Indian Railways under Asansol Division. It is situated in Telwa Bazar in Jamui district in the Indian state of Bihar.

== Facilities ==
The station has a ticket counter,digital watch,tier-3 waiting room,2 big sheds,9 small sheds,drinking water facility, installed fan,high mast light in parking area,Trains time table board and two platforms, which are connected by a foot overbridge. It also has a waiting area. Some Express, MEMU and Passenger trains have scheduled halts here.

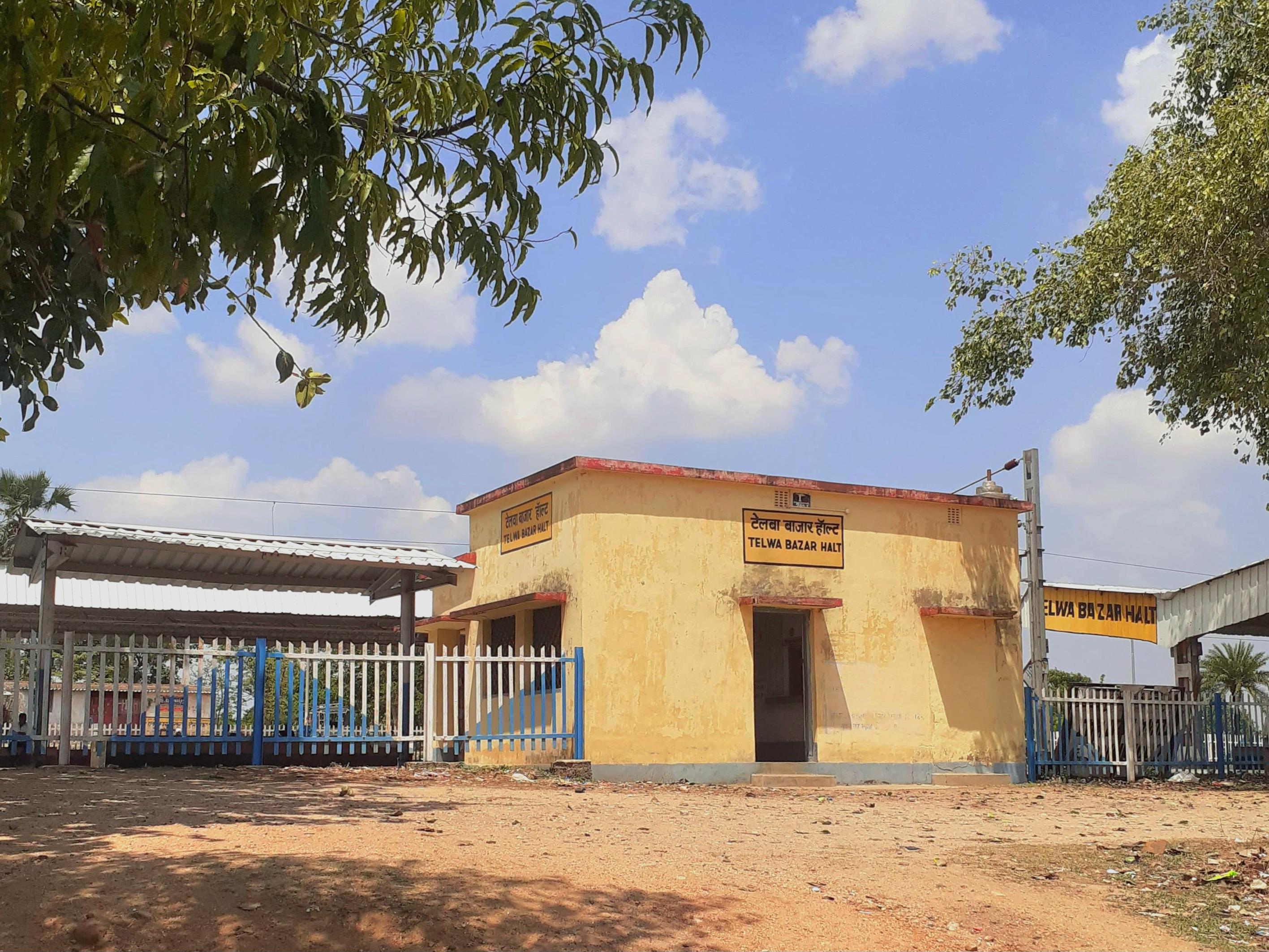
Ticket counter of Telwa Bazar Halt railway station
