= Obra Dam railway station =

Railway station in Uttar Pradesh

General information
- Location: Power House Road, Obra, Uttar Pradesh; India
- Elevation: 209 metres (686 ft)
- System: Indian Railways station
- Owner: Indian Railways
- Operator: East Central Railway
- Platforms: 2
- Tracks: 3

Construction
- Structure type: Standard (on-ground station)
- Parking: No
- Cycle facilities: No
- Accessible: No

Other information
- Status: Construction – Doubling+Electrification
- Station code: OBR
- Zone(s): East Central Railway
- Division(s): Dhanbad
Location
- Location within India Location within Uttar Pradesh

Obra Dam railway station is a small railway station in Sonbhadra district, Uttar Pradesh. Its code is OBR. It serves Obra town. The station consists of two platforms. The platforms are not well sheltered. It lacks many facilities including water and sanitation.
