= Chauri Chaura railway station =

Rail station in Uttar Pradesh, India

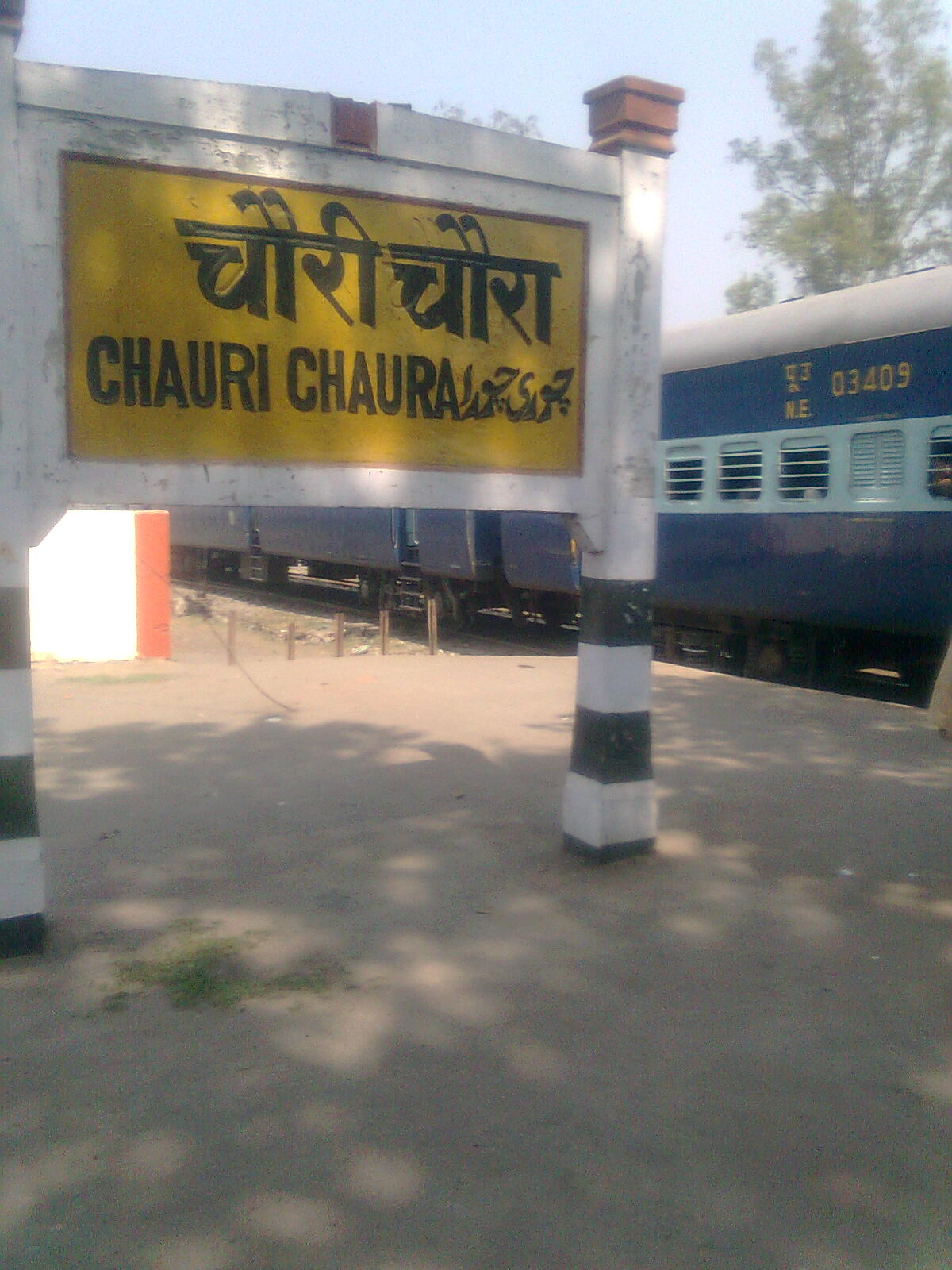
- Chauri Chaura railway station

General information
- Location: Gorakhpur–Deoria Highway, Chauri Choura, Gorakhpur, Uttar Pradesh; India
- Coordinates: 26.6449°N 83.5872°E
- Elevation: 86 metres (282 ft)
- System: Indian Railways station
- Owner: Indian Railways
- Operator: Varanasi railway division
- Platforms: 2
- Tracks: 4
- Connections: Auto stand

Construction
- Structure type: Standard (on-ground station)
- Parking: No
- Cycle facilities: No

Other information
- Status: Functioning
- Station code: CC
- Fare zone: North Eastern Railway
Location
- Location within India Location within Uttar Pradesh

Chauri Chaura railway station is a small railway station in Gorakhpur district, Uttar Pradesh. Its code is CC. It serves Chauri Chaura city. The station consists of two platforms. The platform is not well sheltered. It lacks many facilities including water and sanitation.

== Trains ==
- Bagh Express
- Kashi Express
- Gorakhpur Intercity
- Maurya Express
- Siwan Gorakhpur Express
- Chhapra Gorakhpur Express
- Siwan Nakaha Jungle Express
