= Ranchi Road railway station =

Railway station in Jharkhand

RANCHI ROAD

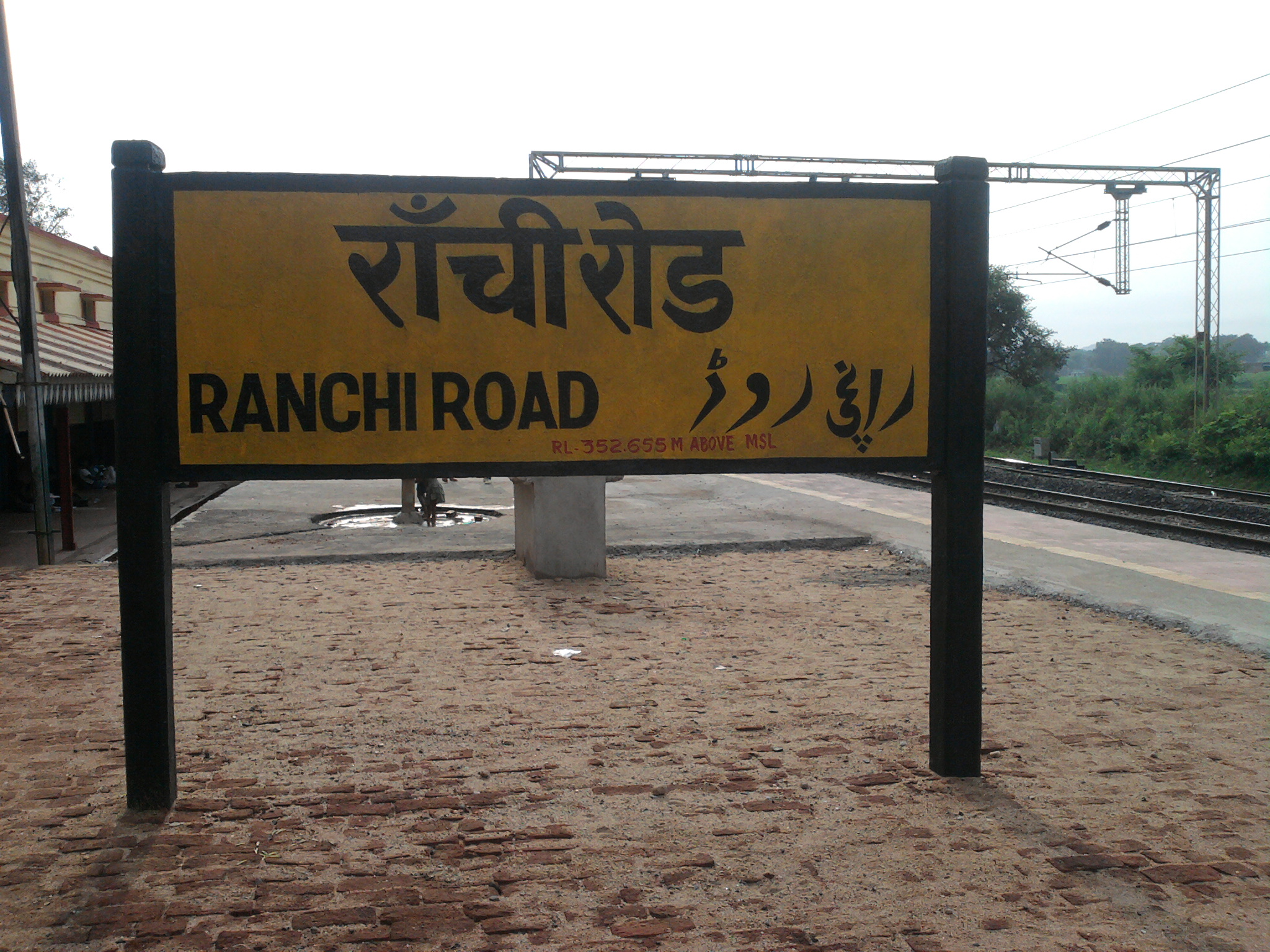

General information
- Location: Ranchi Road, Ramgarh, Ramgarh district, Jharkhand; India
- Coordinates: 23.6660°N 85.5117°E
- Elevation: 357 metres (1,171 ft)
- System: Indian Railways station
- Owner: Indian Railways
- Operator: East Central Railway
- Line: Gomoh–Barkakana branch line
- Platforms: 2
- Tracks: 5

Construction
- Structure type: Standard (on-ground station)
- Parking: Yes
- Cycle facilities: No
- Accessible: No

Other information
- Status: Double electric line
- Station code: RRME
- Zone(s): East Central Railway
- Division(s): Dhanbad

History
- Opened: 1927
Location
- Location within Jharkhand Location within India

Ranchi Road railway station is a compact railway station in Ramgarh district, Jharkhand. Its code is RRME. It serves Ramgarh township area as well as other areas of the Ramgarh district. The station consists of two platforms. The platforms are well sheltered. It is located on Gomoh–Barkakana branch line.

It is located in the northern side of the Ramgarh city. The name 'Ranchi Road' comes after Ranchi which once connected only by narrow-gauge line and at that time Ranchi Road was the nearest broad-gauge station to the Ranchi.

== Trains ==
- Dhanbad - Mumbai LTT Weekly Express
- Shaktipunj Express
- Palamu Express
- Gomoh–Chopan Passenger
- Asansol–Barkakana Passenger
- Gomoh–Barwadih Passenger

== See also ==
- Ramgarh Cantonment railway station
- Indian Railways
- List of railway stations in India
