= Dhanbad railway division =

Railway division of India

Dhanbad railway division is one of the five railway divisions under the jurisdiction of the East Central Railway zone of Indian Railways. Formed on 5 November 1951, its headquarters are located at Dhanbad in the Indian state of Jharkhand. It is the largest coal-loading division in Indian Railways. The administrative head of the division is the Divisional Railway Manager (DRM); as of April 2018, the DRM was Akhilesh Mishra.

Danapur railway division, Pandit Deen Dayal Upadhyaya railway division, Samastipur railway division, and Sonpur railway division are the other railway divisions under the East Central Railway zone, headquartered at Hajipur.

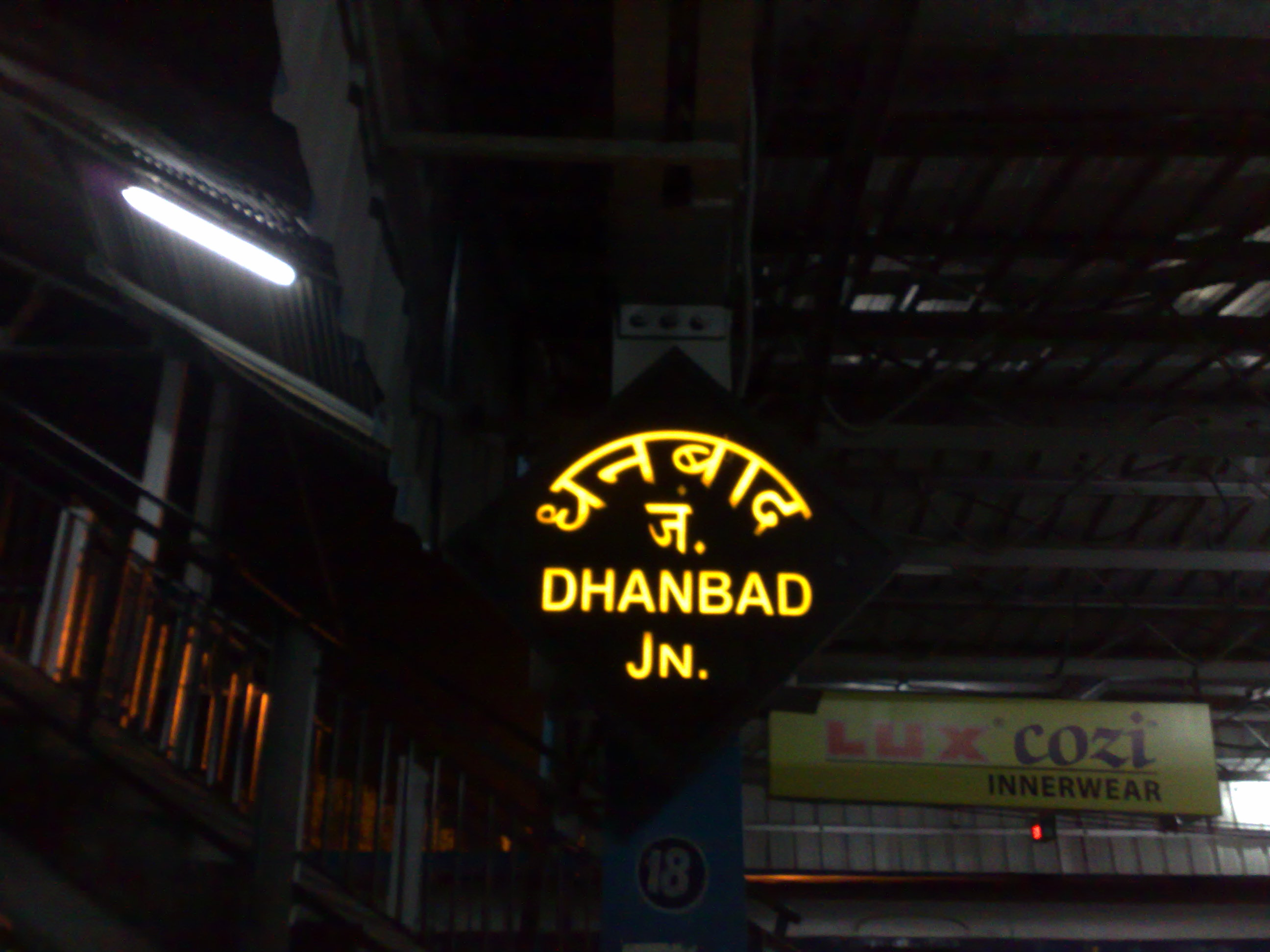
Dhanbad Junction

== List of railway stations and towns ==
The table below lists stations under the Dhanbad railway division by category.

Category of station	No. of stations	Names of stations
A-1	1	Dhanbad Junction
A	5	Netaji Subhas Chandra Bose Junction Gomoh, Koderma Junction, Daltonganj, Parasnath, Singrauli
B	5	Barkakana Junction, Garwa Road, Renukoot, Chandrapura, Chopan
C (suburban station)	0	-
D	18	Katrasgarh, Hazaribagh Road, Paharpur, Tori Junction, GHQ, Nagar Untari, Barwadih Junction, Bokaro Thermal, Gumia, Latehar, Khalari, Phusro, Patratu, Ranchi Road, Shaktinagar Terminal, Tetulmari, Parsabad, Wyndhamganj, Anpara, New Giridih
E	64	McCluskieganj
F halt station	43	-
Total	136	-
