= Bokaro Thermal railway station =

Railway station in Jharkhand

Bokaro Thermal Railway Station

General information
- Location: Station Road, Phusro, Jharkhand; India
- Coordinates: 23.7864°N 85.8794°E
- Elevation: 240 metres (790 ft)
- System: Indian Railways station
- Owner: Indian Railways
- Operator: Dhanbad railway division
- Platforms: 2
- Tracks: 3
- Connections: Auto stand

Construction
- Structure type: Standard (on-ground station)
- Parking: Yes
- Cycle facilities: No

Other information
- Status: Functioning
- Station code: BKRO
- Fare zone: East Central Railway
Location

Bokaro Thermal Railway Station is a small railway station in Bokaro district, Jharkhand. Its code is BKRO. It serves Bokaro Thermal city. The station consists of two platform. The platform is not well sheltered. It lacks many facilities including water and sanitation.
