= Dhanbad Junction railway station =

Railway station in Jharkhand

DHANBAD JUNCTION

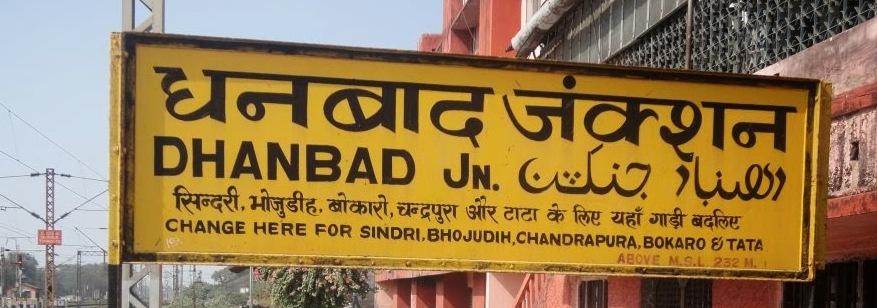
- View of the platform with the station nameboard

General information
- Location: Station Road, Dhanbad, Jharkhand; India
- Coordinates: 23°47′32″N 86°25′42″E
- Elevation: 235.00 metres (771.00 ft)
- System: Indian Railways station
- Owner: Indian Railways
- Operator: East Central Railways
- Lines: Asansol–Gaya section of Grand Chord, Howrah–Gaya–Delhi line, Howrah–Prayagraj–Mumbai line, Dhanbad–Singrauli line, Dhanbad–Pradhankunta–Patherdih-Bhojudih–Adra Line, Railways in Jharia Coalfield Dhanbad–Jharia–Patherdih Line (Now dismantled due to the hazard of underground fire & Land Subsidence in Jharia Coalfields.)
- Platforms: 1–8 including 1A
- Tracks: 11

Construction
- Structure type: NSG-2 Grade
- Parking: Available
- Accessible: Available

Other information
- Status: Operational
- Station code: DHN
- Zone(s): East Central Railway zone
- Division(s): Dhanbad

History
- Opened: 1894; 132 years ago
- Rebuilt: 1956; 70 years ago
- Electrified: 1960; 66 years ago

Passengers
- 100,000+
Route map
- Sources: Google maps; Indian Railway Time Table (Indiarailinfo); Hatia-Bardhaman Passenger 53062; Gomoh-Barkakana Passenger 461EC
Location
- Location within India Location within Jharkhand Location within India
- Interactive map of Dhanbad Junction

Dhanbad Junction railway station, station code DHN, is a railway station of the Indian railway serving the city of Dhanbad, the headquarters of Dhanbad district in the Indian state of Jharkhand. It is the largest railway station in Jharkhand, handling over 100 trains and 100000+ passengers every day. It is one of the Top 100 booking stations of Indian Railways. Dhanbad is also the headquarters of the Dhanbad Rail Division of the East Central Railway zone. Grand Chord rail-line that connects Howrah and New Delhi passes through Dhanbad junction. Dhanbad is located at 23°47′32″N 86°25′42″E. It has an elevation of 235 metres (771 ft).

One of the largest and busiest railway junctions, it is one of the most important stations on the Grand Chord. CIC rail line starts from Dhanbad and ends at Singrauli in Madhya Pradesh. Besides the CIC section there was a direct line to Ranchi which goes through Bokaro and Chandrapura. Most trains bound for Ranchi take this route. Dhanbad has a rail connectivity with the other major parts of the country such as Kolkata, Mumbai, Delhi, Chennai, Goa, Jammu, Katpadi, Lucknow, Ahmedabad, Bikaner, Hyderabad, Kochi, Indore, Bhopal, Gwalior, Jabalpur, Jaipur, Firozpur, Nagpur, Guwahati, Jamshedpur, Patna, Daltonganj, Kolhapur, Bhubaneswar, etc. Another rail line passing through the district, starts at Kharagpur and ends at Gomoh, this rail line comes under South Eastern Railway. Dhanbad is connected with most of the states through rail network.

There used to be another railway line from Dhanbad connecting it to Jharia and Pathardih. The line used to intersect the CIC section, requiring a diamond crossing near Purana Bazar. Now that the line has been dis-mantled, the Diamond Crossing is no longer operational. Previously when there were much less trains from Ranchi and adjoining areas, Dhanbad along with Tatanagar railway station served as the main railway stations for the entire state of Jharkhand.

== Overview ==
The entire belt between Durgapur (158 km from Howrah), and all the way up to Dhanbad and beyond is industrialized. Apart from factories, there are many coalmines, some closed now, and some with fires burning deep in the mineshafts. The mining area extends for a large area, mostly to the south of the tracks. Quite a portion of the track passes through cuttings, where the surrounding area is higher than the track level, resulting in the profusion of characteristic small masonry bridges crossing the tracks." This description is from "Gomoh loco shed and CLW trip record" by Samit Roychoudhury.

== History ==
The East Indian Railway Company extended its lines to Katrasgarh via Dhanbad in 1894.

In the Railways in Jharia Coalfield, amongst the major sections of EIR were the Dhanbad-Phularitand section (21.6 km) opened in 1894 to Katrasgarh and extended to Phularitand in 1924, and the Dhanbad-Jharia-Pathardih section opened in 1903.

New developments

In February 2012, The Indian Railways had planned to set up a Railway Station Development Corporation (RSDC) that will work on improving the major railway stations including Dhanbad Junction by building and developing restaurants, shopping areas and food plazas for commercial business and improving passenger amenities.

== Electrification ==
The Kumardhubi–Dhanbad, Pradhankhanta–Pathardih and Dhanbad–Gomoh sectors were electrified in 1960–61.

== Facilities ==
The station houses all the major facilities like waiting rooms, computerized reservation facility, dormitory, retiring rooms, cafeteria, bookshop, food plaza etc. Existing facilities are being revamped for developing it as model station. The Railway station is a divisional headquarters of East Central Railway and houses a number of non-passenger related facilities like loco sheds, washing lines etc. in its premises. From 21 November 2016 free RailWire WiFi facility is also available. If You have to come on Manaitand and Joraphatak Area then come across the Platform No. 8, If You have to reach central area of Dhanbad then come across the Platform No. 1A main gate. You can also get various types of Magazines, NewsPapers, and more facilities on Platform No. 1,2 & 3.

An escalator has been installed on platform 2 and 3 at the station. It has made the station easier to use for older and disabled passengers.

External videos
- Video of Rajdhani Express from Dhanbad Junctionretrieved 8.03.2012

== Transport and connectivity ==
Dhanbad station is very well connected by roadways. There is a bus stand just outside the railway station, where buses for nearby cities like Kolkata, Patna, Jamshedpur, Ranchi, Bokaro, Giridih, Asansol and Durgapur are easily available.

Outside the station, there is a taxi stand wherein a lot of taxis are always available.

Dhanbad along with Ranchi and Jamshedpur were provided with buses under JNNURM scheme, for city transportation. These buses can be used for local transportation.

Autos remain the mainstay of civilian transport in the city. These autos can be used to travel throughout the length of the city, using very nominal fares.

== Trains ==
Some of the major trains through Dhanbad are :–

• 12301/02 Howrah–New Delhi Rajdhani Express

• 12313/14 Sealdah Rajdhani Express

• 12259/60 Sealdah–Bikaner Duronto Express

• 22303/04 Howrah–Gaya Vande Bharat Express

• 12019/20 Howrah-Ranchi Shatabdi Express

• 22363/64 Dhanbad - Coimbatore Amrit Bharat Express

• 13379/80 Dhanbad - Mumbai LTT Weekly Express

• 16619/20 Podanur - Dhanbad Amrit Bharat Express

• 13065/66 Howrah - Anand Vihar Terminal Amrit Bharat Express

• 12329/30 West Bengal Sampark Kranti Express

• 22317/18 Sealdah–Jammu Tawi Humsafar Express

• 22323/24 Shabd Bhedi Superfast Express

• 12323/24 Howrah–Barmer Superfast Express

• 12379/80 Jallianwalla Bagh Express

• 13167/68 Kolkata–Agra Cantonment Express

• 12319/20 Kolkata–Gwalior Superfast Express

• 12175/76 Howrah–Gwalior Chambal Express

• 12307/08 Howrah–Jodhpur Express

• 12937/38 Garba Superfast Express

• 12495/96 Pratap Superfast Express

• 12987/88 Ajmer–Sealdah Express

• 12321/22 Howrah–Mumbai CSMT Mail (via Gaya)

• 17005/06 Hyderabad–Raxaul Express

• 13351/52 Dhanbad–Alappuzha Express

• 13307/08 Ganga Sutlej Express (Dhanbad–Firozpur Cantt)

• 13329/30 Ganga Damodar Express (Dhanbad-Patna)

• 11045/46 Deekshabhoomi Express (Dhanbad–Kolhapur)

• 13301/02 Swarnarekha Express (Dhanbad–Tatanagar)

• 11447/48 Shaktipunj Express

• 22387/88 Black Diamond Express

• 12339/40 Coalfield Express

• 15027/28 Maurya Express

• 15661/62 Ranchi–Kamakhya Express

• 19413/14 Ahmedabad–Kolkata Express

• 13009/10 Doon Express

• 12311/12 Netaji Express

• 17007/08 Secunderabad - Darbhanga Express

• 18621/22 Patna–Hatia Patliputra Express

• 13403/04 Ranchi - Bhagalpur Vananchal Express

• 13331/32 Dhanbad - Patna Intercity Express

• 13305/06 Dhanbad–Gaya Intercity Express

• 13303/04 Dhanbad–Ranchi Intercity Express

• 11631/32 Bhopal - Dhanbad Express

• 18403/04 Bhubaneswar - Dhanbad Express

• 17321/22 Vasco-da-Gama - Jasidih Weekly Express

• 18603/04 Ranchi - Godda Express

• 18185/86 Tatanagar Godda Express

And many more trains

== Significance ==
Dhanbad Jn is a Category NSG-2 , station as well as the divisional headquarters. It is the largest station in the adjoining area, and every train has a halt here. Lying centrally on the Grand Chord it is flanked by Gaya Junction on the Delhi side and Asansol railway station on the Howrah side. It is not uncommon to find long-distance trains getting their locomotives and rakes (occasionally) changed here. All the trains including Duronto Express passing through Dhanbad have a stoppage here. Due to shortage in spaces, Dhanbad does-not have any loco-shed at present. It used to have a steam loco shed earlier. It has a trip loco shed at its outer section, has its electric loco shed at Gomoh and its diesel loco shed at Patratu. Being the largest station in the area it finds a very heavy patronage and a huge number of passengers use this station every day. A lot of people from adjoining districts like Bokaro, Koderma, Giridih come to Dhanbad early morning to catch the 'morning trains' to various destinations like Kolkata, Durgapur, Jamshedpur, Ranchi, Patna, Burdwan and Gaya. Dhanbad also became the 1st station in the country to have an AC double-decker express running till Howrah Junction which is now discontinued.

== Further extension ==
Railways is mulling to connect Dhanbad with New Giridih via Pradhankhunta, Govindpur and Tundi.

== See also ==
- Dhanbad
