= Chandrapura Junction railway station =

Railway station in Jharkhand, India

CHANDRAPURA JUNCTION

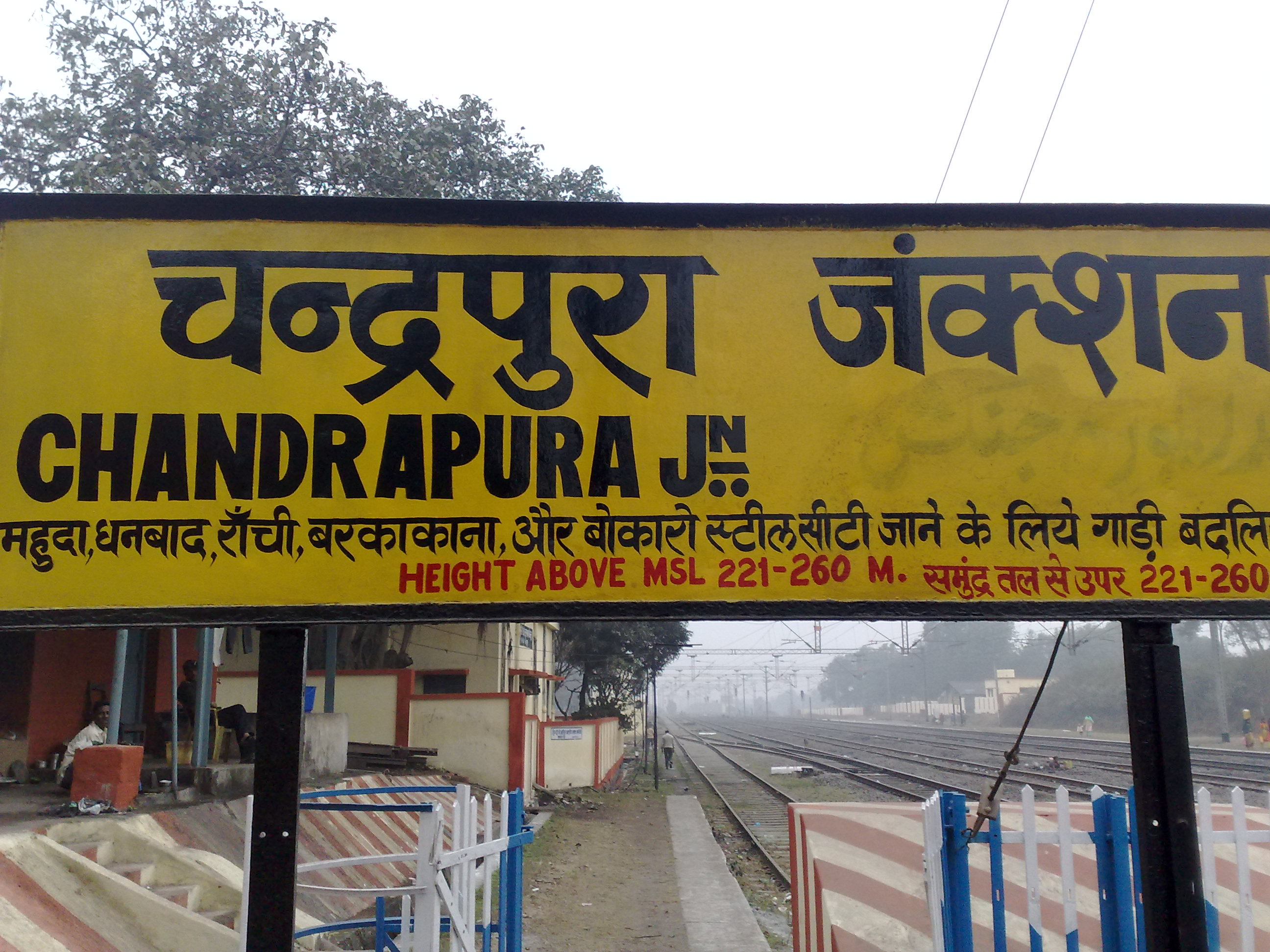
- View of the station nameboard

General information
- Location: Chandrapura, Bokaro district, Jharkhand; India
- Coordinates: 23°45′19″N 86°07′11″E
- Elevation: 227 metres (745 ft)
- System: Indian Railways junction station
- Owner: Indian Railways
- Operator: East Central Railway
- Lines: Gomoh–Barkakana branch line Chandrapura–Muri branch line Mahuda–Adra–Kharagpur Railways in Jharia Coalfield
- Platforms: 4
- Tracks: 6

Construction
- Structure type: Standard (on ground station)
- Parking: Yes
- Cycle facilities: No

Other information
- Status: Functioning
- Station code: CRP
- Zone(s): East Central Railway zone
- Division(s): Dhanbad

History
- Opened: 1913; 113 years ago
- Rebuilt: 1927
- Electrified: 1986–89
Services
| Preceding station | Indian Railways | Following station |
|---|---|---|
| Telo towards ? | East Central Railway zone Gomoh–Barkakana branch line | Bhandaridah towards ? |
| Jamuniatand towards ? | East Central Railway zone Chandrapura–Muri branch line Dhanbad-Chandrapura line | Rajabera towards ? |
Route map
Location
- Location within India Location within Jharkhand
- Interactive map of Chandrapura Junction

Chandrapura Junction Railway Station i is a railway junction station at the junction of Gomoh–Barkakana branch line and Chandrapura–Muri branch line mainly a part of Railways in Jharia Coalfield. It is located in Bokaro district in the Indian state of Jharkhand. It is administered by the Dhanbad Railway Division of the East Central Railway zone of Indian Railways.

== History ==
In 1913, Chandrapura was connected to Mahuda and merged to Gomoh–Mahuda–Adra–Kharagpur (BNR) line and then became a Railways in Jharia Coalfield. In 1927, the Central India Coalfields Railway opened the Gomoh–Barkakana line. Later, the line was amalgamated with East Indian Railway. The construction of the 143 kilometres (89 mi) long Chandrapura–Muri–Ranchi–Hatia line started in 1957 and was completed in 1961.

== Electrification ==
Railway lines in the Chandrapura area (including Bokaro Steel City Yard) were electrified in 1986–89.
