= Dehri-on-Sone railway station =

Railway station in Rohtas, Bihar, India

Dehri-On-Sone
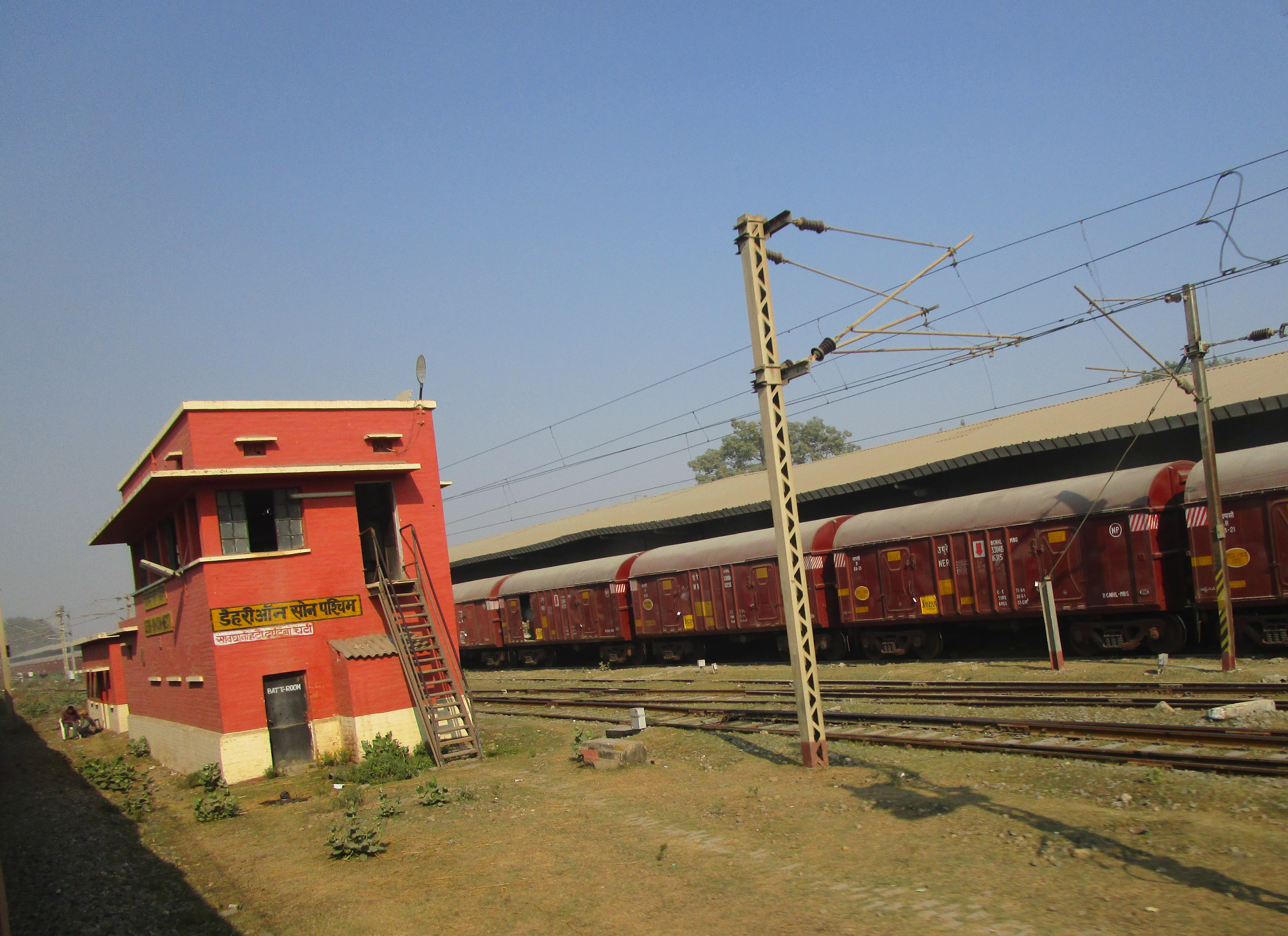
- Dehri-on-Sone railway station west control room

General information
- Location: Station Road, Dehri, Rohtas district, Bihar; India
- Coordinates: 24°54′54″N 84°11′08″E
- Elevation: 114 metres (374 ft)
- System: Indian Railways station
- Owner: Indian Railways
- Operator: East Central Railways
- Lines: Howrah–Gaya–Delhi line, Howrah–Prayagraj–Mumbai line, Gaya–Pandit Deen Dayal Upadhyaya Junction section, Grand Chord
- Platforms: 6
- Tracks: 10

Construction
- Structure type: Standard on ground
- Parking: Yes
- Cycle facilities: Yes
- Accessible: Available

Other information
- Status: Functioning
- Station code: DOS
- Zone(s): East Central Railway zone
- Division(s): Pandit Deen Dayal Upadhyaya

History
- Opened: 1906; 120 years ago
- Electrified: 1961–63
- Former names: East Indian Railway Company, Eastern Railway

Services
Preceding station	Indian Railways	Following station
Son Nagar towards ?	East Central Railway zone Gaya–Pandit Deen Dayal Upadhyaya Junction section	Pahaleja Halt towards ?
Location
- Location within Bihar Location within India

Dehri-on-Sone railway station (station code: DOS) is on the Gaya–Pandit Deen Dayal Upadhyaya Junction section of the Grand Chord line. It stands next to the Nehru Setu and serves Dehri and the surrounding areas in Rohtas district in the Indian state of Bihar. It is located on the banks of Son river, a tributary of river Ganges.

== History ==
The Grand Chord was commissioned in 1906.

=== Dehri Rohtas Light Railway ===
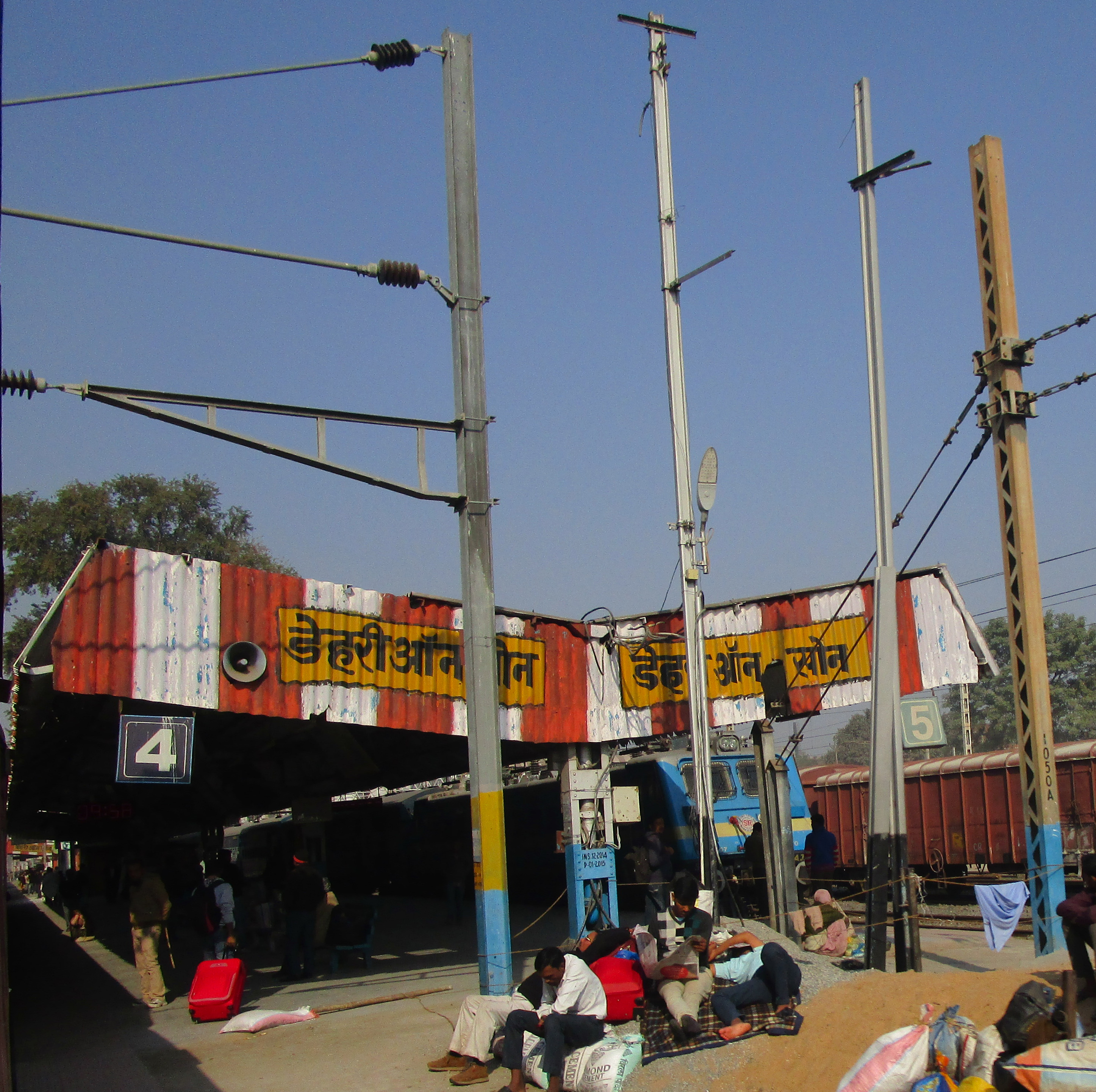
Dehri-on-Sone railway station platform no. 4 and 5

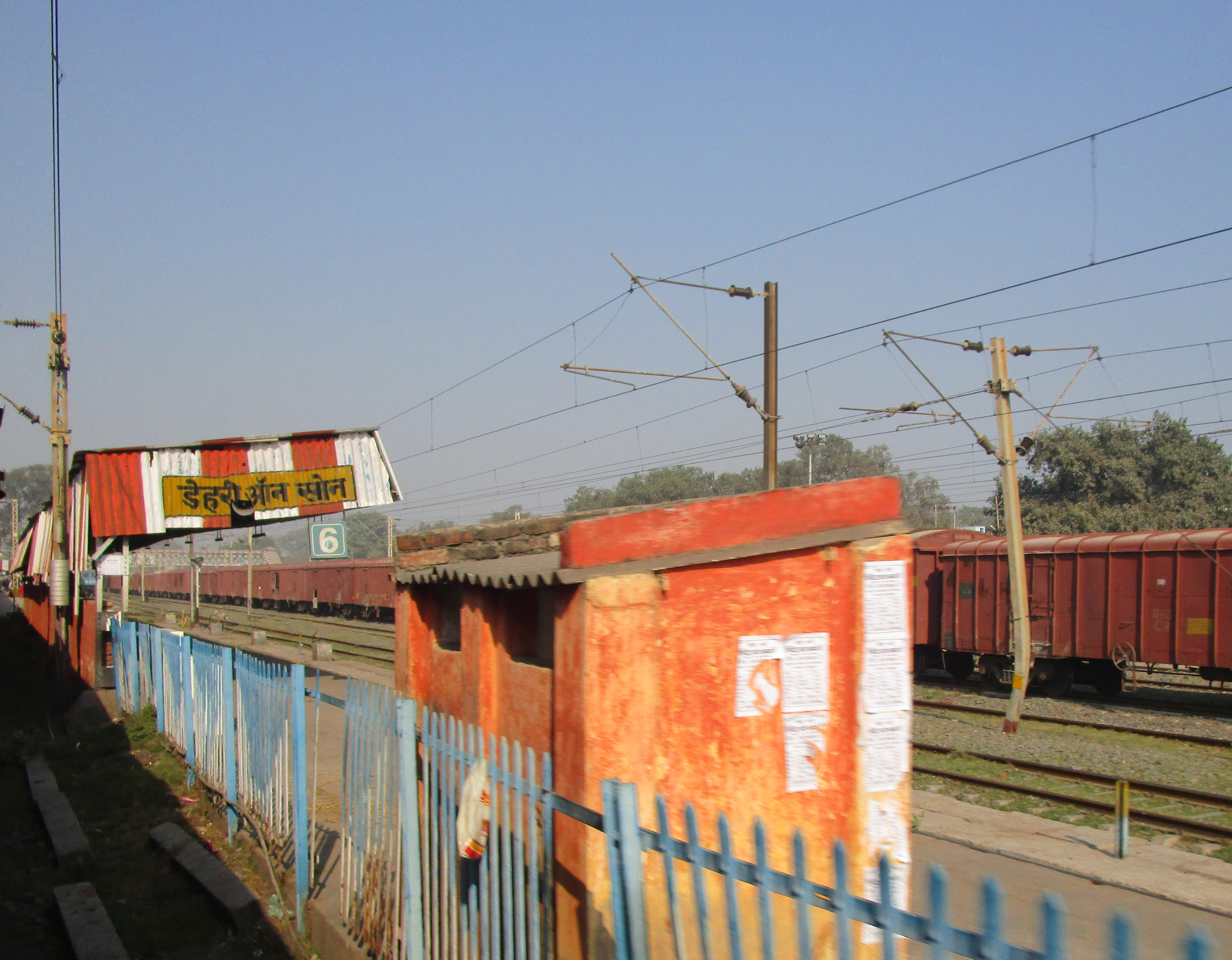
Dehri-on-Sone railway station platform no. 6

The 67 km (42 mi) long 2 ft 6 in (762 mm) wide narrow gauge Dehri Rohtas Light Railway stretching from Dehri-on-Sone to Rohtas was opened in 1911. It was closed in 1984.

== Electrification ==
The Gaya–Mughalsarai sector was electrified in 1961–63.

== Amenities ==
Dehri-on-Sone railway station has 1 non-AC retiring room, and a four-bedded non-AC dormitory. It has a restaurant. The station has computerized reservation facilities.
