= Sasaram Junction railway station =

Railway station in Rohtas, Bihar, India

Sasaram Junction Sahasram
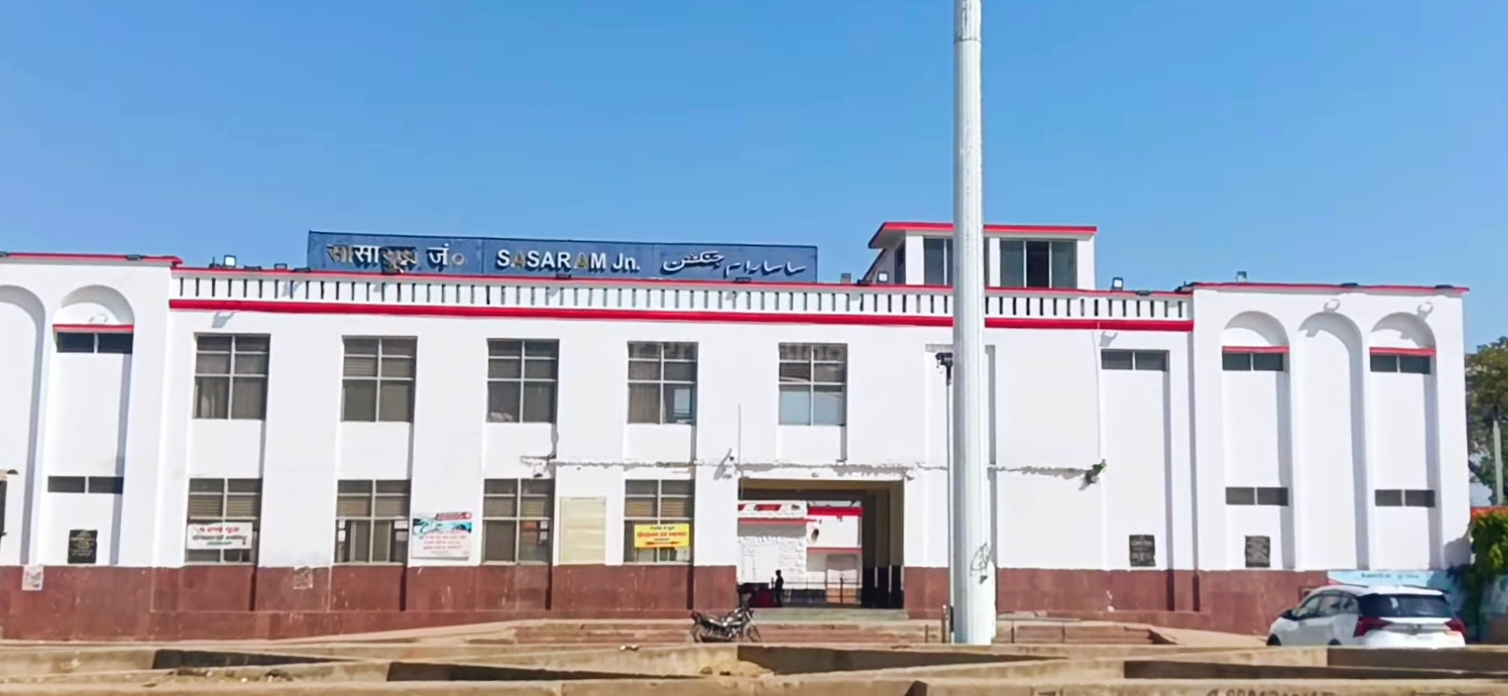
- Sasaram Junction

General information
- Location: Old G.T. Road, Gandhi Chowk, Sasaram, District- Rohtas, Bihar 821115; India
- Coordinates: 24.9562°N 84.0192°E
- Elevation: 107.776 m (353.60 ft)
- System: Indian Railways station
- Owner: Indian Railways
- Operator: East Central Railways
- Lines: Howrah–Gaya–Delhi line, Gaya–Pandit Deen Dayal Upadhyaya Junction section, Howrah–Prayagraj–Mumbai line, Grand Chord, Ara–Sasaram line
- Platforms: 7
- Tracks: 12
- Train operators: Indian railway

Construction
- Structure type: Standard (on-ground station)
- Parking: Available
- Cycle facilities: Available
- Accessible: Yes

Other information
- Status: Functioning
- Station code: SSM
- Zone(s): East Central Railway zone
- Division(s): Pandit Deen Dayal Upadhyaya
- Website: indianrailways.gov.in

History
- Opened: 1885; 141 years ago
- Electrified: 1961–63

Passengers
- 200000+ per day

Services
| Preceding station | Indian Railways | Following station |
|---|---|---|
| Karwandia towards Gaya Junction or Howrah Junction | East Central Railway zone Gaya–Pandit Deen Dayal Upadhyaya Junction section | Kumahu towards Pandit Deen Dayal Upadhyaya Junction or New Delhi |
| Mokar Halt towards Ara Junction | Ara–Sasaram line | Terminus |
Route map
Location
- Location within Bihar Location within India

Sasaram Junction railway station is on the Gaya–Pandit Deen Dayal Upadhyaya Junction section of the Grand Chord line in India. It serves Sasaram and the surrounding areas in Rohtas district in the Indian state of Bihar. Sasaram is well connected to Delhi and Kolkata. It is also connected to Patna via Ara railway station.

This place was also known for preparation of competitive exams at Sasaram Railway junction. According to earlier natives of this city, there was not proper electrification of city around 2007–2008 which hampered the studies of students seeking for competitive exams. Still Indian Railways had 24 hours power supply at Sasaram Junction. This led a small group of students to study there at night under electric lights. However, the authorities have now banned study groups citing safety concerns.

== History ==
The Grand Chord section of Howrah–Gaya–Delhi line was commissioned in 1906.

=== Arrah–Sasaram Light Railway ===
The Arrah–Sasaram light railway connecting Arrah and Sasaram in Bihar was opened in 1914. This railway line was operated by the Martin's Light Railways and it was built in 2 ft 6 in (762 mm) narrow gauge. The total length of this railway line was 102.2 kilometres (63.5 mi). Due to increasing losses, it was closed in 1978.

In 2006–07, this railway line was converted to Broad gauge 1,676 mm (5 ft 6 in) by the Indian Railways and train services were resumed. After conversion to Broad gauge 1,676 mm (5 ft 6 in), the total length of the Ara–Sasaram line is 97.2 kilometres (60.4 mi).

== Electrification ==
The Gaya–Mughalsarai section was electrified in 1961–63.

== Amenities ==
Sasaram Junction railway station offers a wide range of facilities for the convenience of passengers, including Computerized reservation counter, Automatic Ticket Vending Machine (ATVM), waiting rooms, food stalls, and retiring Room.

== See also ==
Ara–Sasaram DEMU
