= Gaya–Anand Vihar Garib Rath Express =

Train in India

Gaya Junction – Anand Vihar Terminal Garib Rath Express

Overview
- Service type: Garib Rath Express
- First service: 2008; 18 years ago
- Current operator: Northern Railways

Route
- Termini: Anand Vihar Terminal (ANVT); Gaya Junction (GAYA)
- Stops: 8
- Distance travelled: 990 km (615 mi)
- Average journey time: 14 hours 00 minutes as 22410 Anand Vihar Gaya Garib Rath Express, 15 hours 35 minutes as 22409 Gaya Anand Vihar Garib Rath Express.
- Service frequency: Once a week. 22410 Anand Vihar Gaya Garib Rath Express – Saturday. 22409 Gaya Anand Vihar Garib Rath Express – Sunday.
- Train number: 22410 / 22409

On-board services
- Class: AC 3 tier
- Seating arrangements: No
- Sleeping arrangements: Yes
- Auto-rack arrangements: No
- Catering facilities: Available
- Baggage facilities: Storage space under berth

Technical
- Rolling stock: ICF coach
- Track gauge: 1,676 mm (5 ft 6 in)
- Electrification: Yes
- Operating speed: 130 km/h (81 mph) maximum, 63.37 km/h (39 mph) average including halts
Route map
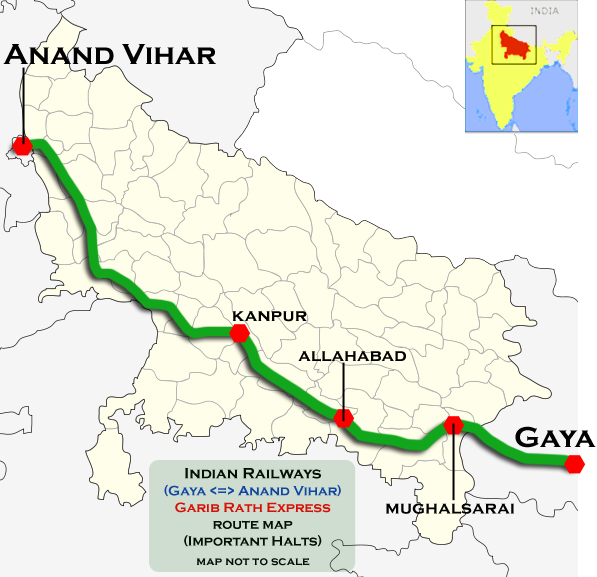

The 22410 / 22409 Gaya–Anand Vihar Terminal Garib Rath Express is a Superfast Express train of the Garib Rath series belonging to Indian Railways – Northern Railway zone that runs between Anand Vihar Terminal and Gaya Junction in India.

It operates as train number 22410 from Anand Vihar Terminal to Gaya and as train number 22409 in the reverse direction, serving the states of Delhi, Uttar Pradesh and Bihar. Initially the train ran from Anand Vihar Terminal to Sasaram Junction later it extended to Gaya Junction.

It is part of the Garib Rath Express series launched by the former railway minister of India, Mr. Lalu Prasad Yadav.

== Coaches ==
The 22410 / 09 Anand Vihar Gaya Garib Rath Express has 17 AC 3 tier & 2 End-on Generator coaches. It does not carry a pantry car. As is customary with most train services in India, coach composition may be amended at the discretion of Indian Railways depending on demand.

== Service ==
The 22410 Anand Vihar Gaya Garib Rath Express covers the distance of 990 km (615 mi) in 13 hours 00 mins (67.23 km/h) and in 14 hours 35 mins as 22409 Gaya Anand Vihar Garib Rath Express (59.93 km/h). As the average speed of the train is above 55 km/h (34 mph), as per Indian Railways rules, its fare includes a Superfast surcharge.

== Routeing ==
The 22410 / 09 Anand Vihar Gaya Garib Rath Express runs from Anand Vihar Terminal via Ghaziabad Junction, Kanpur Central, Allahabad Junction, Mughalsarai Junction, Sasaram, Dehri-on-Sone,Anugraha Narayan Road to Gaya.

== Traction ==
As the route is fully electrified, a Ghaziabad-based WAP-5 locomotive powers the train for its entire journey.

== Operation ==
- 22410 Anand Vihar Gaya Garib Rath Express leaves Anand Vihar Terminal every Saturday, arriving at Gaya the next day.
- 22409 Gaya Anand Vihar Garib Rath Express leaves Gaya every Sunday arriving Anand Vihar Terminal the next day.
