= Dhanaichha railway station =

Railway station in Bihar

Dhanaiccha

General information
- Location: Dhaniachha, Kharsara, Kaimur district, Bihar; India
- Coordinates: 25°13′38″N 83°29′27″E
- Elevation: 73 metres (240 ft)
- System: Indian Railways station
- Owner: Indian Railways
- Operator: East Central Railway
- Line: Gaya–Pandit Deen Dayal Upadhyaya Junction section
- Platforms: 2

Construction
- Structure type: Standard on ground
- Parking: No
- Cycle facilities: No

Other information
- Status: Functioning
- Station code: DCX
- Division(s): Pandit Deen Dayal Upadhyaya

History
- Opened: 1906
- Electrified: 1961–63

Services
Preceding station	Indian Railways	Following station
Durgauti towards ?	East Central Railway zone Mughalsarai–Dhanbad section	Karamnasa towards ?
Location
- Location within Bihar

Dhanaiccha railway station is a railway station situated on the Gaya–Pandit Deen Dayal Upadhyaya Junction section under East Central Railway zone. It is located at Dhaniachha, Kharsara in Kaimur district in the Indian state of Bihar.

== History ==
The East Indian Railway Company started connecting Delhi and Howrah from the mid nineteenth century. In 1862, the railway tracks crossed Mughalsarai and reached the western bank of the Yamuna. The through link to Delhi was established in 1866.

== Electrification ==
The Mughalsarai–Howrah sector was electrified in 1961–63.
