= Chandauli Majhwar railway station =

Railway station in Uttar Pradesh

Chandauli Majhwar

General information
- Location: National Highway 2, Chandauli, Uttar Pradesh; India
- Coordinates: 25°15′41″N 83°16′04″E
- Elevation: 80 metres (260 ft)
- System: Indian Railways station
- Owner: Indian Railways
- Operator: East Central Railway
- Lines: Gaya–Pandit Deen Dayal Upadhyaya Junction section Howrah–Gaya–Delhi line Grand Chord; Howrah–Prayagraj–Mumbai line
- Platforms: 5

Construction
- Structure type: Standard on ground
- Parking: No
- Cycle facilities: No

Other information
- Status: Functioning
- Station code: CDMR
- Division(s): Pandit Deen Dayal Upadhyaya

History
- Opened: 1906
- Electrified: 1961–63

Services
Preceding station	Indian Railways	Following station
Ganj Khwaja towards ?	East Central Railway zone Mughalsarai–Dhanbad section	Saidraja towards ?
Location
- Location within Uttar Pradesh

Chandauli Majhwar railway station is on the Delhi–Howrah line. It is located in Chandauli district in the Indian state of Uttar Pradesh. It serves Chandauli and the surrounding areas. Its name is derived from the district name Chandauli and nearby village named Majhwar Khas.

== History ==
The East Indian Railway Company started connecting Delhi and Howrah from the mid nineteenth century. In 1862, the railway tracks crossed Mughalsarai and reached the western bank of the Yamuna. The through link to Delhi was established in 1866. The Grand Chord was commissioned in 1906.

== Electrification ==
The Mughalsarai–Howrah sector was electrified in 1961–63.
