= Vishunpura =

Vishunpura Bisunpura
- Village
- Location in Chandauli, Uttar Pradesh, India
- Coordinates: 25.27°N 83.27°E
- Country: India
- State: Uttar Pradesh
- District: Chandauli
- Tehsil: Chandauli
- Village: Vishunpura
- Post Office: Vishunpura

Government
  - Body: Gram Panchayat

Area
  - Total: 4.5163 km^{2} (1.7438 sq mi)
- Elevation: 70 m (230 ft)

Population (2011)
  - Total: 3,138
  - Density: 694.8/km^{2} (1,800/sq mi)

Languages
  - Official: Hindi, Bhojpuri
- Time zone: UTC+5:30 (IST)
- PIN: 232104
- Vehicle registration: UP-67
- Average Literacy Rate: 70.73%
- Sarpanch: Prabhat Kumar

Vishunpura is the gram panchayat name of the village Bisunpura. Vishunpura is situated in the Chandauli district, in the state of Uttar Pradesh, India.

== Geography ==
Vishunpura is located at 25.27°N 83.27°E. It has an average elevation of 70 metres (230 ft). It is part of the Chandauli district, under the Varanasi division of Uttar Pradesh. The village is located approximately 40 kilometres from Varanasi. Mughalsarai, a major and very important railway junction between Northern and Eastern India, is located in the Chandauli district. Chandauli Majhwar railway station serves Chandauli.

== Demographics ==
Vishunpura village has a population of 3138, as per census data of 2011, of which the male population is 1624 and the female population is 1514. The total geographical area of "Bisunpura" village is 451.63 hectares. The population density of Bisunpura village is seven persons per hectare. The total number of households in the village is 455. The CD Block name is "Chandauli" and the Tehsil/Taluk or sub district is "Chandauli". The distance of the village from the sub-district headquarters is 10 km.

- Pincode- 232104
- STD Code- 05412

As per the census of 2011, the village code of Bisunpura is 207499. In that year, there were 877 girls per 1000 Boys under six years of age in the village. 1,832 people in the village are literate (1072 male and 760 female) which is a literacy rate of 70.73%. For males, the literacy rate is 80.48% and for females the literacy rate is 60.41%.

== Economy ==
Like all other villages in the country, agriculture is the main occupation of the people of Vishunpura. The major crops are rice, wheat, pulses, mustard, etc. Vegetables like potato, brinjal, peas and carrots are also grown. Vishunpura has a diverse community of people of various castes.

== Food ==
Chapatis prepared from millet flour, along with a meal prepared form spinach and mustard leaves, are the commonest dishes produced in the village. Chapatis are also eaten with ghee, or mixed with homemade jaggery. The villagers also prepare cooked millet with chutney made of tomatoes, garlic leaves, coriander leaves, ginger, green chillies and cumin seeds. Sweet boondies (made from Bengal gram flour and fried in ghee) along with curd is preferred by some people. The preferred sweet in this region is chena, made from milk (after the milk sours, paneer is extracted and then chena is prepared). Jalebies (made from gram flour) along with condensed milk are also a favorite among people in this region.

== Education ==
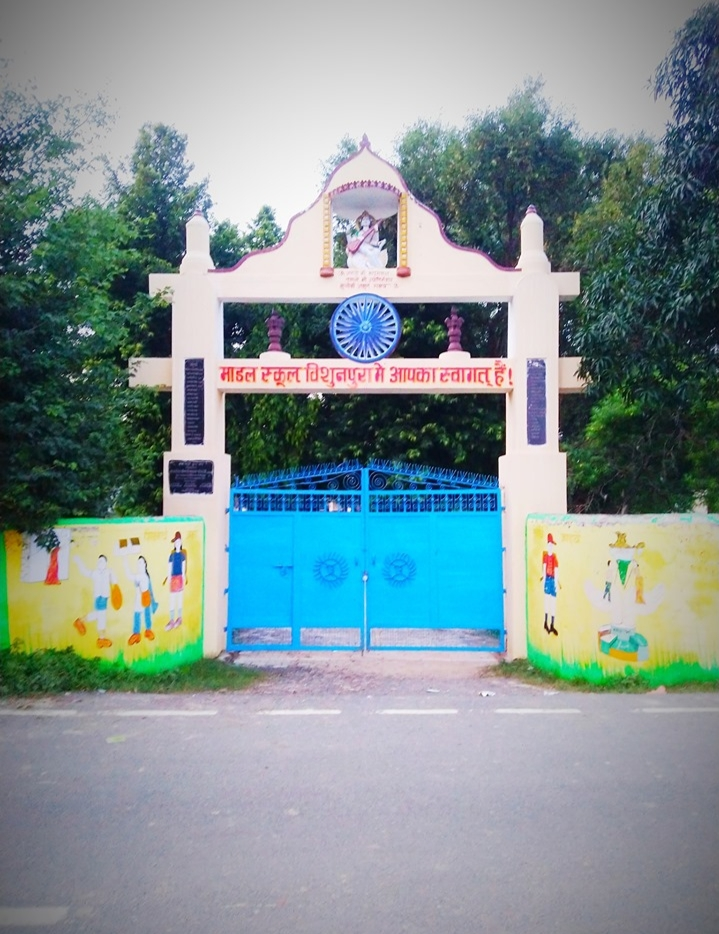
Uchch Madhyamic Vidhalaya, Vishunpura

- Uchch Madhyamic Vidhalaya - Vishunpura
- D.R.B. Inter College - Vishunpura
- Daddy's International School -Vishunpura

== Religious places ==
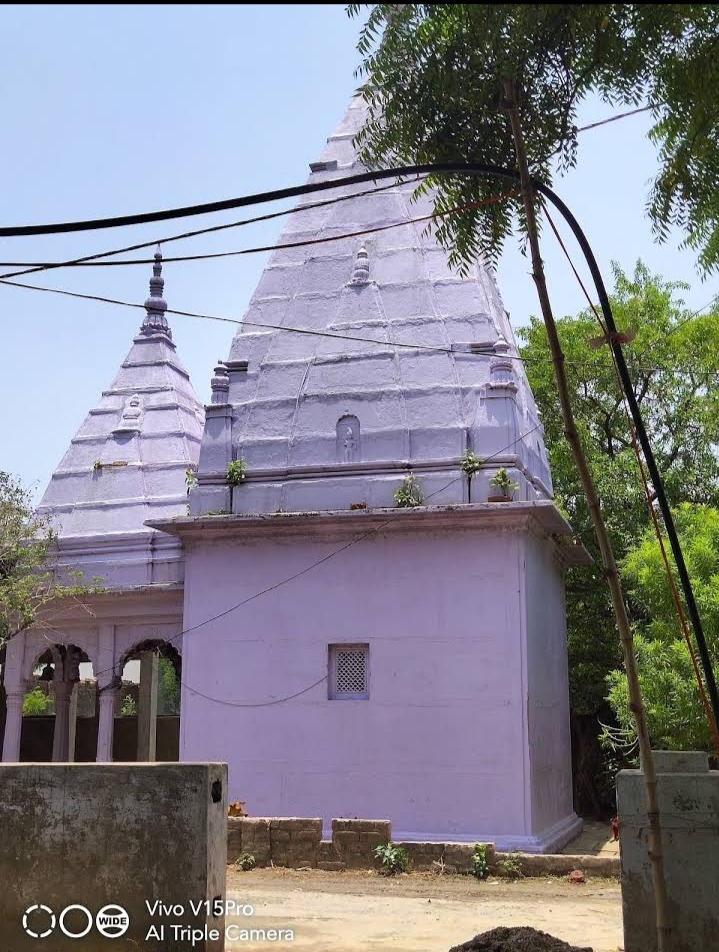
Shiv Mandir, Vishunpura

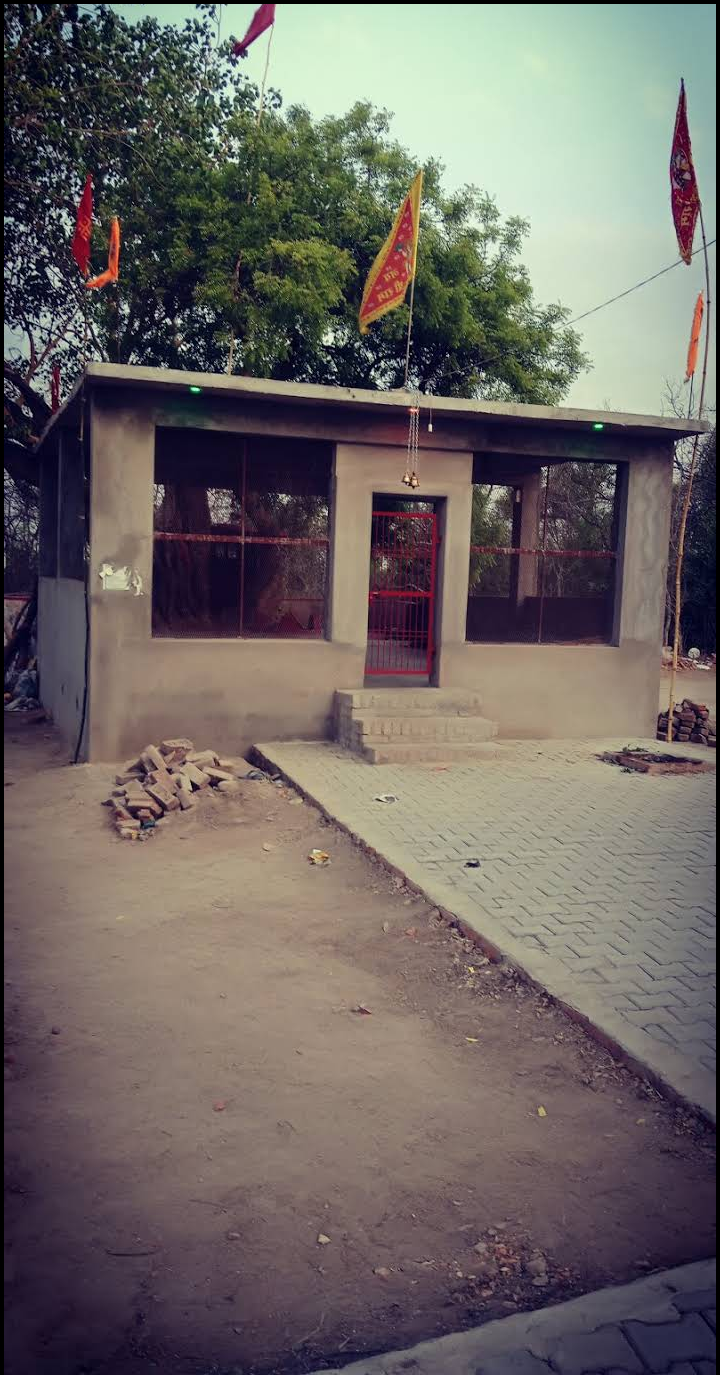
Hanuman Mandir, Hinauti

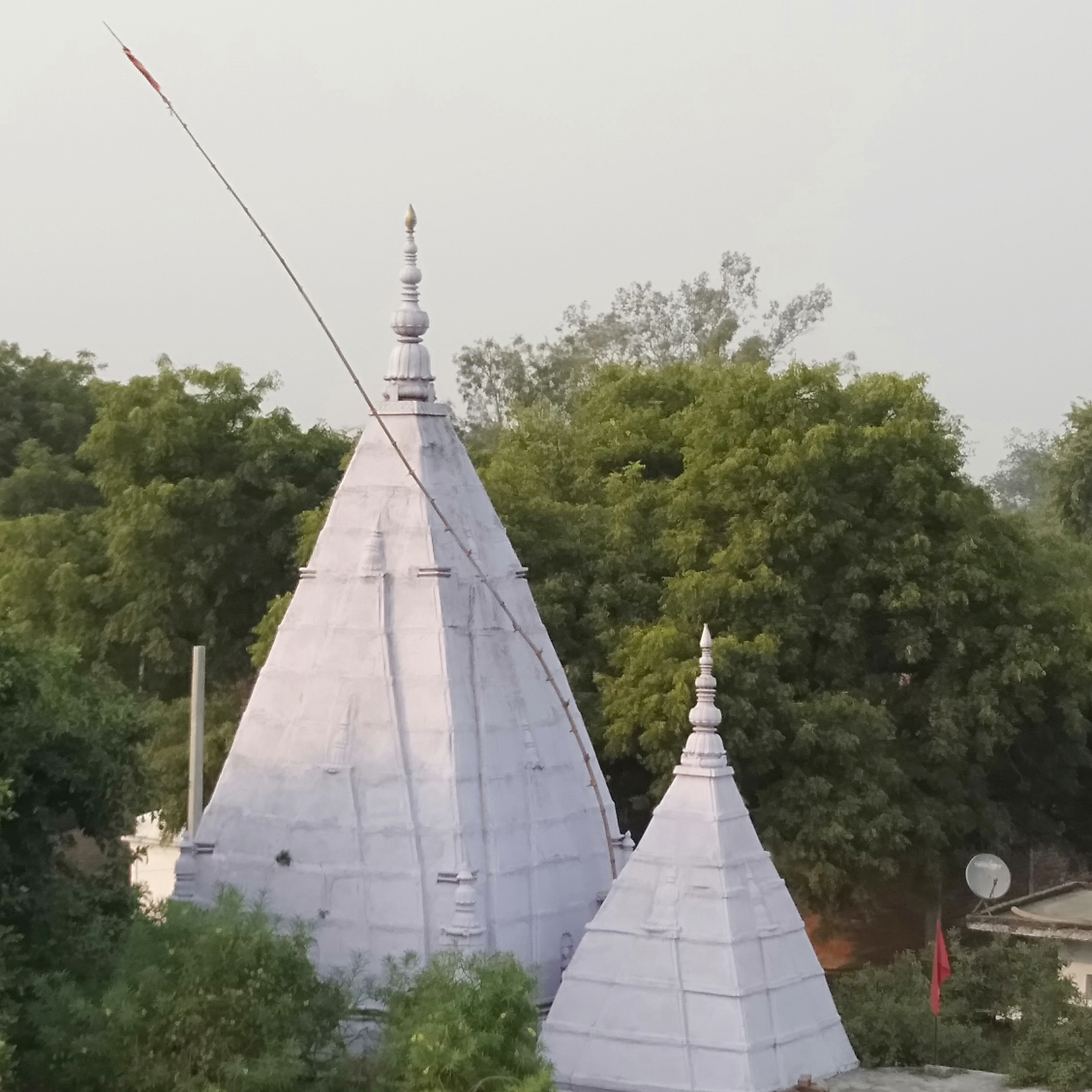
- Shiv Mandir, Vishunpura
  Shiv Temple
- Hanuman Temple
- Badva Mahadev
- Kali Ji Temple
