= Saidraja railway station =

Railway station in Uttar Pradesh

Saidraja

General information
- Location: Saiyedraja Station Road, GT Road, Uttar Pradesh; India
- Coordinates: 25°15′13″N 83°21′04″E
- Elevation: 75 metres (246 ft)
- System: Indian Railways station
- Owner: Indian Railways
- Operator: East Central Railway
- Line: Gaya–Pandit Deen Dayal Upadhyaya Junction section
- Platforms: 5

Construction
- Structure type: Standard on ground
- Parking: No
- Cycle facilities: No

Other information
- Status: Functioning
- Station code: SYJ
- Division(s): Pandit Deen Dayal Upadhyaya

History
- Opened: 1906
- Electrified: 1961–63

Services
Preceding station	Indian Railways	Following station
Karamnasa towards ?	East Central Railway zone Mughalsarai–Dhanbad section	Chandauli Majhwar towards ?
Location
- Location within Uttar Pradesh

Saidraja railway station is a railway station situated on the Gaya–Pandit Deen Dayal Upadhyaya Junction section under East Central Railway zone. It is located at Saidraja Station Road, Grand Trunk Road in Chandauli district in the Indian state of Uttar Pradesh.

== History ==
The East Indian Railway Company started connecting Delhi and Howrah from the mid nineteenth century. In 1862, the railway tracks crossed Mughalsarai and reached the western bank of the Yamuna. The through link to Delhi was established in 1866.

== Electrification ==
The Mughalsarai–Howrah sector was electrified in 1961–63.
