= SYJ =

SYJ may refer to:

- SYJ, the IATA airport code for Sirjan Airport, Kerman Province, Iran
- SYJ, the Indian Railways station code for Saidraja railway station, Uttar Pradesh, India
