= Ara–Sasaram DEMU =

Train service in India

Ara–Sasaram MEMU
Overview
- Service type: MEMU
- First service: August 23, 2017; 9 years ago
- Current operator: East Central Railway zone

Route
- Termini: Ara Junction (ARA); Sasaram Junction (SSM)
- Stops: 26
- Distance travelled: 97 km (60 mi)
- Average journey time: 2 hours 45 minutes
- Service frequency: Daily
- Train number: 63369/63370/63371/63372

On-board services
- Class: General Unreserved
- Seating arrangements: Yes
- Sleeping arrangements: No
- Catering facilities: No
- Observation facilities: ICF coach
- Entertainment facilities: No
- Baggage facilities: Below the seats

Technical
- Rolling stock: 2
- Track gauge: 1,676 mm (5 ft 6 in)
- Operating speed: 35 km/h (22 mph) average with halts

The Ara–Sasaram MEMU is a passenger train service operated by the East Central Railway zone of Indian Railways, connecting Ara Junction and Sasaram Junction in Bihar. It operates under train numbers 63369 and 63371 from Ara to Sasaram, and 63370 and 63372 in the return direction, with services running six days a week. The service was originally operated by DEMU trains before being converted to MEMU operations on 4 March 2022.

== Service ==
- Train 63369, Ara–Sasaram MEMU, covers 97 km (60 mi) in 2 hours 45 minutes at an average speed of approximately 35 km/h (22 mph).
- Train 63371, Ara–Sasaram MEMU, covers 97 km (60 mi) in 2 hours 50 minutes at an average speed of approximately 34 km/h (21 mph).
- Train 63370, Sasaram–Ara MEMU, covers 97 km (60 mi) in 2 hours 40 minutes at an average speed of approximately 36 km/h (22 mph).
- Train 63372, Sasaram–Ara MEMU, covers 97 km (60 mi) in 2 hours 45 minutes at an average speed of approximately 35 km/h (22 mph).

== See also ==
- Sasaram Junction railway station
- Ara Junction railway station
