= Sitarampur =

- Neighbourhood in Asansol
- Location in Asansol, West Bengal, India
- Coordinates: 23.72°N 86.88°E
- Country: India
- State: West Bengal
- District: Paschim Bardhaman
- City: Asansol
- Elevation: 100 m (330 ft)
- Demonym: Asansolians / Asansolites/ Asansolbashi

Languages*
  - Official: Bengali
- Time zone: UTC+5:30 (IST)
- PIN: 713359
- Telephone code: 0341
- Lok Sabha constituency: Asansol
- Vidhan Sabha constituency: Kulti
- Website: paschimbardhaman.co.in

Sitarampur is a neighbourhood in Asansol, West Bengal. It is governed by the Asansol Municipal Corporation, and was one of the early hubs of coal mining activity.

== Geography ==
Cities, towns and ECL Areas in the western portion of Asansol Sadar subdivision in Paschim Bardhaman district
MC: municipal corporation, P: rural administrative centre, CT: census town, N: neighbourhood, OG: out growth, T: temple
Owing to space constraints in the small map, the actual locations in a larger map may vary slightly

=== Location ===
Sitarampur is located at 23.72°N 86.88°E. It has an average elevation of 100 m (330 ft).

=== Urbanisation ===
According to the 2011 Census of India, 83.33% of the population of Asansol Sadar subdivision was urban and 16.67% was rural. The Asansol Sadar subdivision had 26 census towns.

=== Asansol Municipal Corporation ===
According to the Kolkata Gazette notification on 3 June 2015, the municipal areas of Kulti, Raniganj and Jamuria were included within the jurisdiction of Asansol Municipal Corporation.

== History ==
=== Coal mines ===
Coal in India was first discovered around Sitarampur. The early mines were Baro Dhemo and Sundarchak, which are now defunct. As those mines started to dry up, new virgin plots were excavated, some of which extended beyond the Damodar River into the Purulia district, and beyond River Barakar into the Nirsa of Dhanbad district in Jharkhand.

=== Mines safety ===
With hectic operations in the mines, accidents occurred frequently leading to loss of life. The government regulated the mining process with the Directorate of Mines Safety. It inspected mining procedures with firm laws and imposed hard penalties for non-compliance, which resulted in an accident and fatality reduction. The zonal office of the Directorate General of Mines Safety is located at Sitarampur.

A small captive explosive manufacturing factory was established at Sitarampur to supply dynamite for solid blasting in open cast mines. The unit was in operation from around 1914 to 1935.

== Demographics ==
=== Language ===
It mainly consists of Bengali, Gujarati, Marwari, and Hindi-speaking people from Bihar and Jharkhand. Bengali is the official language in Sitarampur.

== Economy ==
=== Coal ===
Sitarampur is mainly a coal-mining center, and many people in Sitarampur and Neamatpur work in the coal mines of Eastern Coalfields.

Collieries in the Sitarampur Area of Eastern Coalfields are: Mithani, Bejdi, Dhemomain, Narsamuda, BC Incline and Patmohana.

== Transport ==
As coal became transported by train more frequently, a new railway line, the Grand Chord, was laid from Sitarampur to Mughalsarai.

The Howrah-Delhi rail track separates into the Main and Grand Chord lines at Sitarampur and rejoins at Mughalsarai.

Some major trains that stop at Sitarampur are Dhanbad – Howrah Coalfield Express and Black Diamond Express, Kathgodum Express, and Mithila Express.

Sitarampur is connected by the Grand Trunk Road, which passes through Neamatpur.

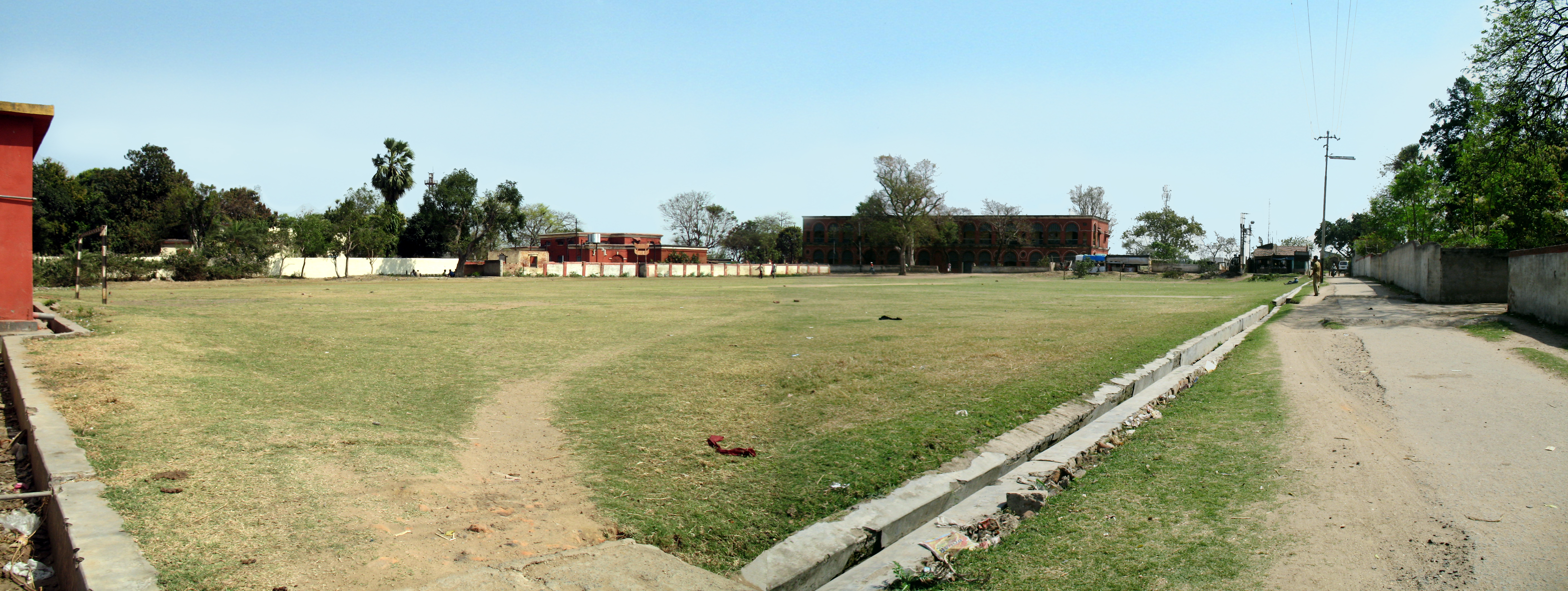
The Field of Sitarampur

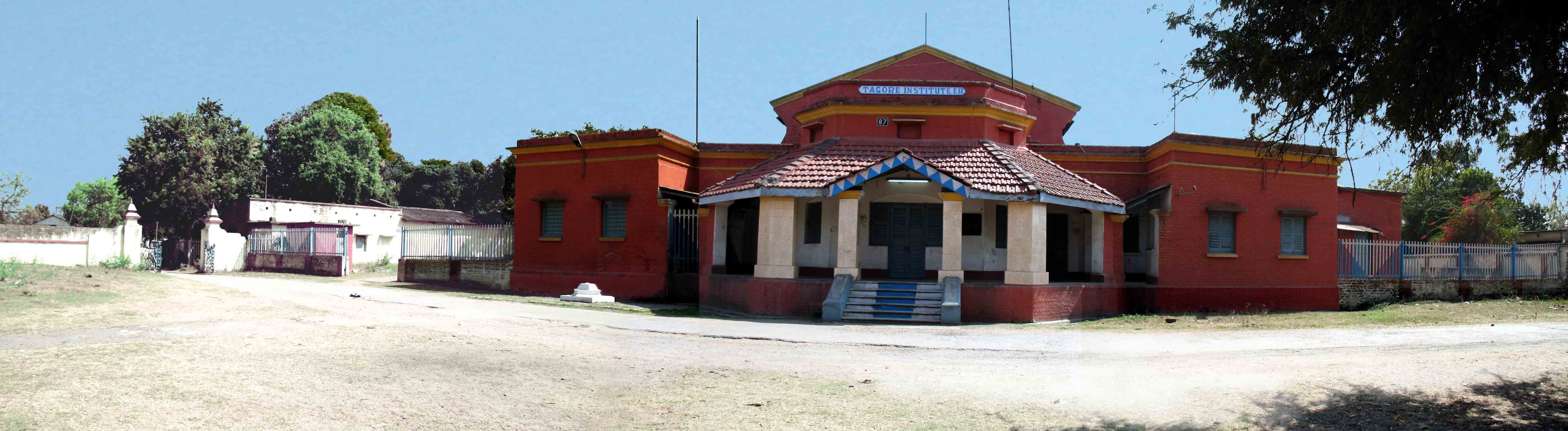
Tagore Institute, Sitarampur

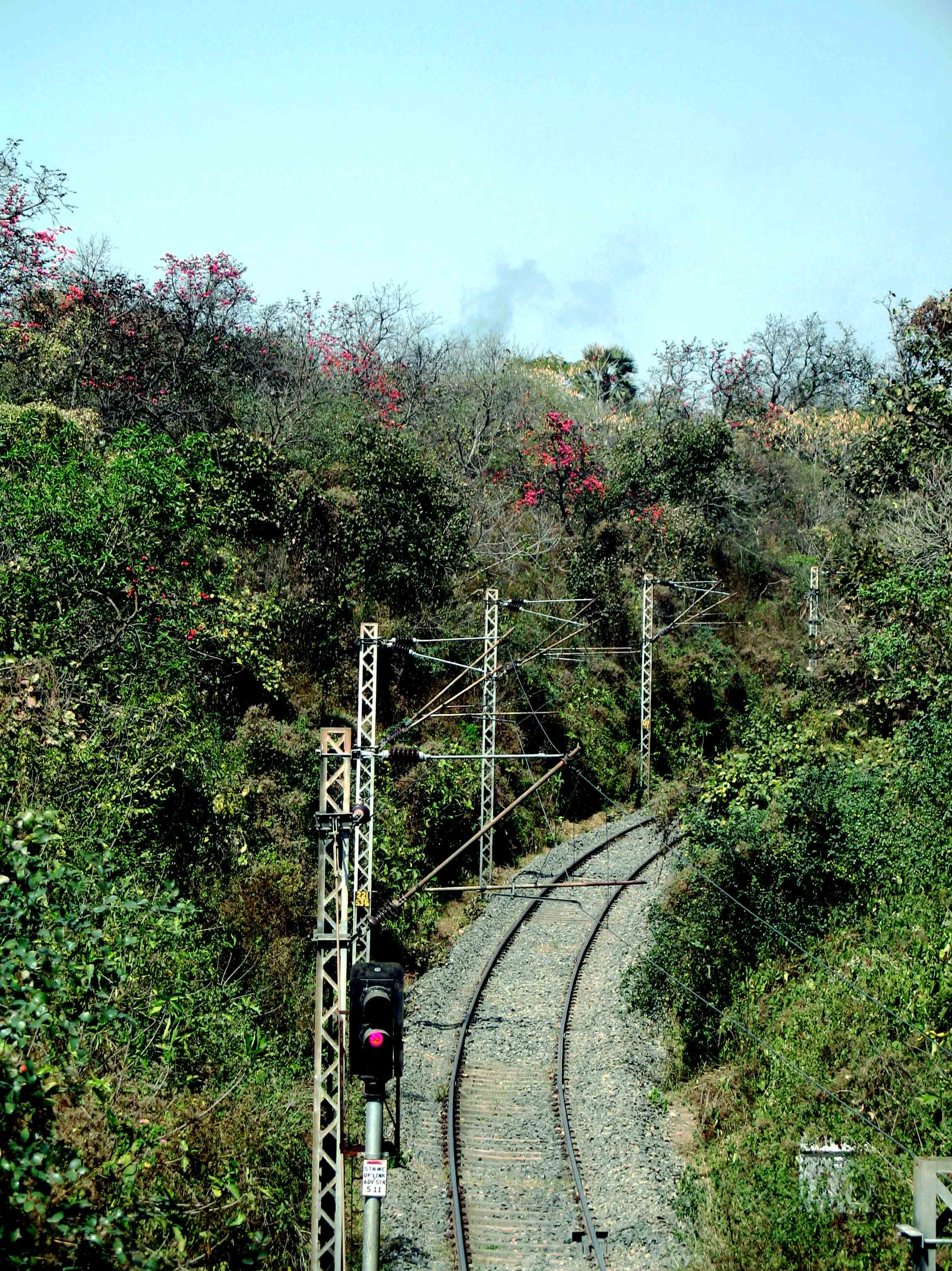
The Loop, Sitarampur

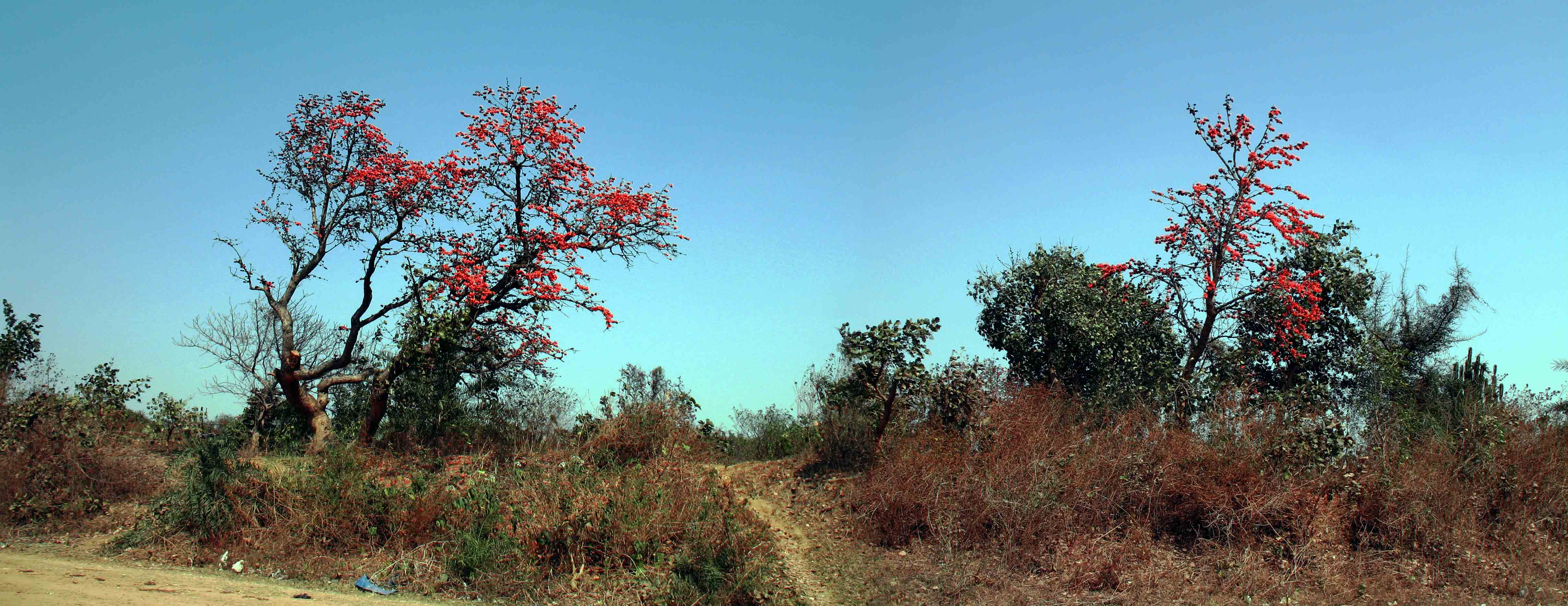
Forest Flame Trees in Sitarampur

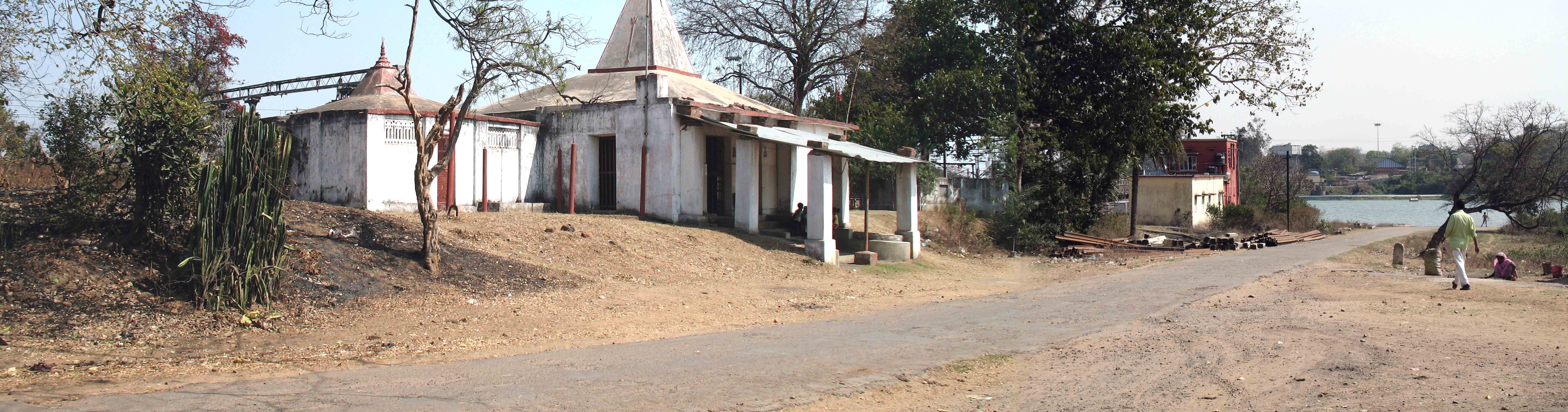
The Loco Tank and Bokababa Temple of Sitarampur
