= Anugraha Narayan Road railway station =

Railway station in Aurangabad, Bihar, India

Anugraha Narayan Road
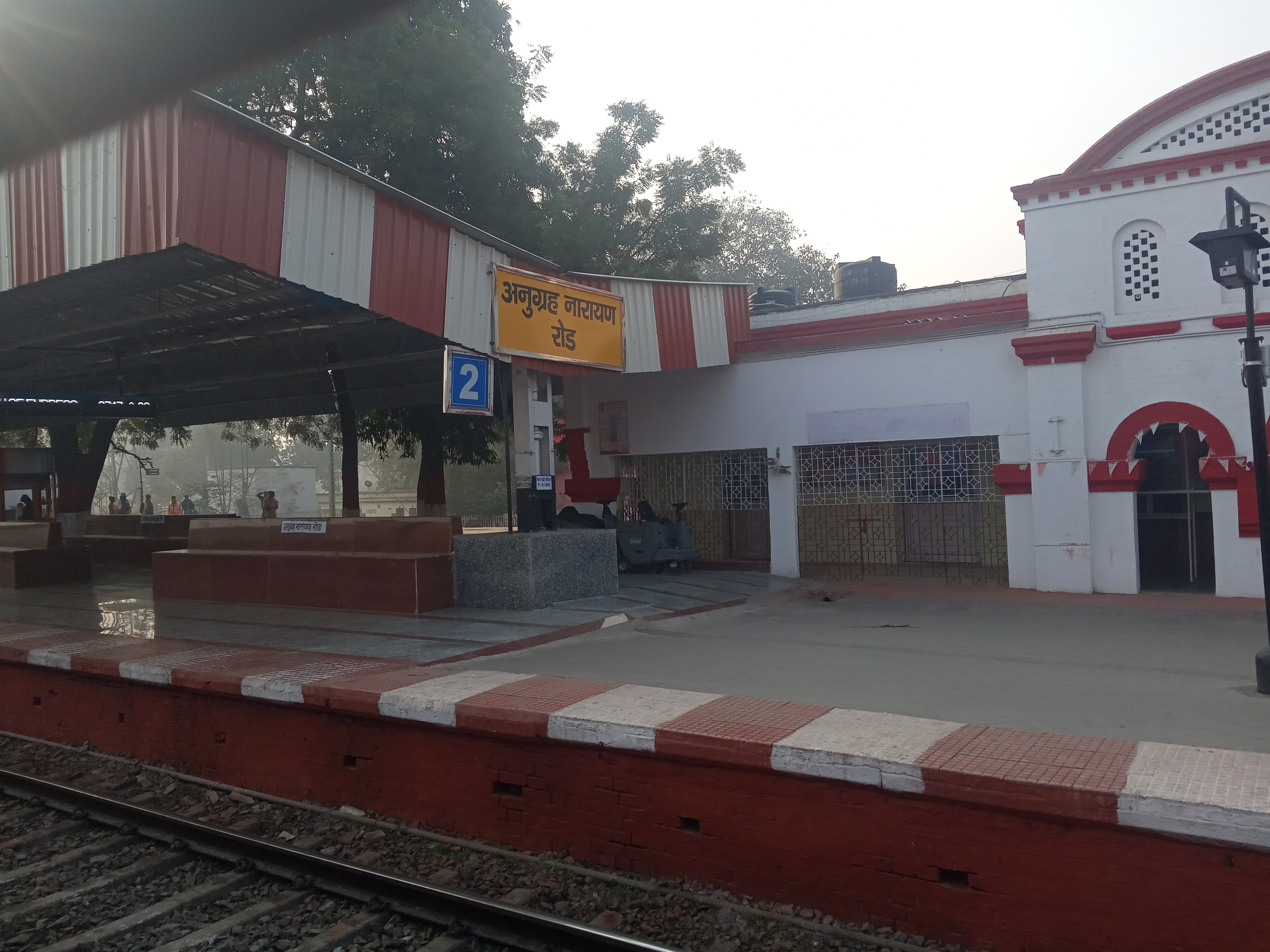
- Anugraha Narayan Road railway station

General information
- Location: Anugraha Narayan Road, Aurangabad, Bihar; India
- Coordinates: 24.8558°N 84.3297°E
- Elevation: 104 metres (341 ft)
- System: Indian Railways station
- Owner: Indian Railways
- Line: Gaya–Pandit Deen Dayal Upadhyaya Junction section
- Platforms: 4
- Tracks: 6
- Connections: Auto and bus stand, food stall, drinking water

Construction
- Structure type: Standard (on-ground station)
- Parking: Yes
- Accessible: Yes

Other information
- Status: Functioning
- Station code: AUBR
- Zone(s): East Central Railway
- Division(s): Pandit Deen Dayal Upadhyaya
Location
- Location within Bihar Location within India

Anugraha Narayan Road railway station is a main railway station in Aurangabad district, Bihar. Its code is AUBR. It serves Aurangabad town. The station consists of four platforms. The station is named after freedom fighter and first Deputy Chief Minister cum Finance Minister of the Indian state of Bihar (1946–1957) Bihar Vibhuti Dr. Anugrah Narayan Sinha. Anugraha Narayan is an A grade station which falls under Pt Deendayal Upadhyaya division (formerly known as Mughalsarai). Under the scheme of digital India, WiFi facility is available here.

It is mainly connected to Delhi, Mumbai, Kolkata, Jaipur, Lucknow, Ahmedabad, Bhubaneswar, Indore, Pune, Bhopal, Patna, Kanpur, Dhanbad, Ranchi, Jamshedpur and Jodhpur.

AN Road has stoppage of 56 trains which includes superfast, express and passenger trains.

In 2019 AN Road was ranked the 10th most improved station throughout the country by scoring 796.88 out of 1000. The station has been provided with several passenger-friendly amenities and modern facilities. The waiting hall of the station has been decorated with wall paintings, and a fast food unit has been provided on platform two. A train display board for train information, and a coach induction board for coach location, have been provided at the station. People who want to visit Deo Surya Mandir and Umga Pahad, Pawai Pahad can deboard at this station.
