= Gaya Junction railway station =

Railway station in Gaya, Bihar, India

Gaya Junction
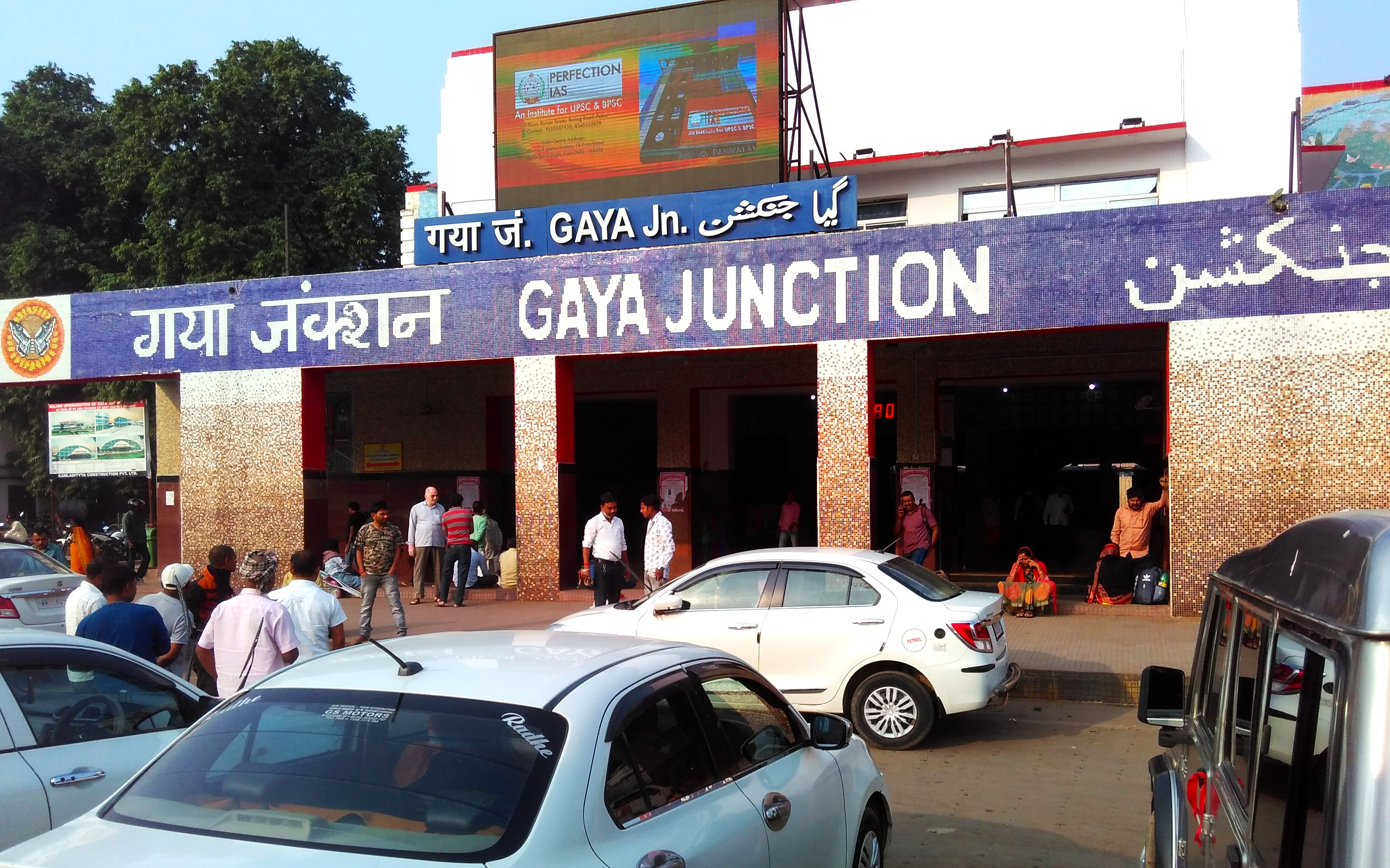
- Gaya Junction

General information
- Location: Gaya, Gaya district, Bihar; India
- Coordinates: 24°48′12″N 84°59′58″E
- Elevation: 117 metres (384 ft)
- System: Indian Railways
- Owner: Indian Railways
- Operator: East Central Railway zone
- Lines: Grand Chord; New Delhi–Gaya–Howrah main line; Howrah–Prayagraj–Mumbai line; Asansol–Gaya section; Gaya–Pandit Deen Dayal Upadhyaya Junction section; Patna–Gaya line; Gaya–Kiul line; Eastern Dedicated Freight Corridor; Barkakana–Son Nagar line
- Platforms: 11
- Tracks: 14

Construction
- Structure type: At-grade
- Parking: Available
- Cycle facilities: Available

Other information
- Status: Functional
- Station code: GAYA
- Zone(s): East Central Railway zone
- Division(s): Pandit Deen Dayal Upadhyaya

History
- Opened: 1879; 147 years ago
- Rebuilt: 2023-2025
- Former names: East Indian Railway Company; Eastern Railway zone
Route map
Location
- Location within India Location within Bihar Location within India
- Interactive map of Gaya Junction

Gaya Junction railway station (station code:- GAYA) is a junction station serving the city of Gayaji, the headquarters of Gayaji district and Magadh Division in the Indian state of Bihar. Gaya is in the Pandit Deen Dayal Upadhyaya railway division of the East Central Railway zone. Grand Chord rail-line that connects Howrah and New Delhi passes through Gaya. It lies between Pandit Deen Dayal Upadhyaya Junction on the Delhi side and Dhanbad Junction on the Howrah side. It is located at 24°48′13″N 84°59′57″E. It has an elevation of 117 metres (384 ft). Gaya is connected with most of the states through rail network.

There are also two other broad-gauge train lines from Gayaji, one to Patna and the other to Kiul Junction. The city has two major railway stations: Gaya Junction & Manpur Junction. Gaya is well connected with Patna, Jehanabad, Biharsharif, Rajgir, Islampur, Nawada, Dehri on sone through daily passenger and express train services.

== History ==
Several years before the Grand Chord was built, a connection from the Howrah–Delhi main line to Gaya was developed in 1900 and the South Bihar Railway Company (operated by EIR) had laid a line from Lakhisarai to Gaya in 1879. The Grand Chord was opened on 6 December 1906.

New developments

In February 2012, the Indian Railways had planned to set up a Railway Station Development Corporation (RSDC) that will work on improving the major railway stations including Gaya Junction by building and developing Restaurants, shopping areas and food plaza for commercial business and improving passenger amenities.

== Facilities ==
There are 10 platforms in the Gaya Junction which are from platform 1 to 7 and 1A & 1B. There is 1 Pilgrim Platform also, where the pilgrim train stop. The platforms are interconnected with foot overbridges (FOB). It has three foot overbridge, the station houses all the major facilities like waiting rooms, computerized reservation facility, food plaza, dormitory, retiring rooms, cafeteria, bookshop, etc. Existing facilities are being revamped for developing it as model station under Amrit Bharat Station Scheme.

== Trains ==
Gaya Junction's location on the Delhi–Kolkata Grand chord route, makes it served by numerous express and superfast trains from all over the country. Gaya Junction is the second most important railway station in Bihar after Patna and second largest in terms of platforms after Patna Jn. It is a junction and is connected to all the major cities such as New Delhi, Kolkata, Mumbai and Chennai through important broad-gauge routes (direct trains). Now it is also directly connected to Guwahati (N-E India). There is a direct train

- Dhanbad - Coimbatore Amrit Bharat Express
- Mahabodhi Express from New Delhi to Gaya daily.
- Gaya–Anand Vihar Garib Rath Express has been added from Gaya to Anand Vihar Terminal (Delhi), which runs weekly.
- Howrah–Gaya Vande Bharat Express from Kolkata to Gaya.
- Ekatmata Express from Lucknow.
- Howrah–Gaya Express from Howrah.
- Patna–Gaya Passenger
- Kamakhya–Gaya Weekly Express

There are direct trains from Gaya to important stations in India like Delhi, Kolkata, Dhanbad, Chennai, Kamakhya–Guwahati, Ranchi, Patna, Parasnath(Shikharji), Bokaro, Varanasi, Lucknow, Kota, Kanpur, Allahabad, Agra, Bareilly, Mathura, Jabalpur, Bhopal, Indore, Nagpur, Mumbai, Pune, Puri, Ahmedabad, Jodhpur, Amritsar, Dehradun, Kalka, Jammu, Gwalior, Dehradun, Ranchi, Jamshedpur (Tatanagar), Bhuvaneshwar, Bhavnagar etc. Several electrified local passenger trains also run from Gaya to neighbouring destinations at regular intervals. Gaya Patna daily bond passenger train also plays a very essential role in the development of Bihar. The train starts from Gaya Junction to Patna Junction via Bela, Chakand, Jehanabad, Makhdoompur.
