= New Delhi–Gaya–Howrah main line =

Railway line in India

New Delhi–Gaya–Howrah Main Line

Overview
- Status: Operational
- Owner: Indian Railways
- Locale: West Bengal, Jharkhand, Bihar, Uttar Pradesh, Delhi
- Termini: Howrah,Sealdah,Kolkata; New Delhi,Old Delhi,Anand Vihar Terminal

Service
- Operator(s): Eastern Railway, East Central Railway, North Central Railway, Northern Railway

History
- Opened: 1906

Technical
- Line length: 1,451 km (902 mi)
- Number of tracks: 2
- Track gauge: 5 ft 6 in (1,676 mm) broad gauge
- Electrification: 25 kV 50 Hz AC OHLE during 1960–1966
- Operating speed: up to 160 km/h
- Highest elevation: Koderma 398 metres (1,306 ft)

The New Delhi–Gaya–Howrah is a railway line connecting New Delhi and Howrah cutting across Indo-Gangetic Plain and a comparatively small stretch of the line crossing over the Chota Nagpur Plateau. It covers a distance of 1,451 kilometres (902 mi) across, West Bengal, Jharkhand, Bihar, Uttar Pradesh and Delhi. The Grand Chord is a part of this line and as such is referred to by many as Howrah–Delhi line (via Grand Chord).

== Sections ==
The 1,451 km (902 mi) long trunk line, amongst the long and busy trunk lines connecting the metros, has been treated in more detail in smaller sections:

1. Howrah–Bardhaman chord
2. Bardhaman–Asansol section
3. Asansol–Gaya section
4. Gaya–Mughalsarai section
5. Mughalsarai–Kanpur section
6. Kanpur–Delhi section

== History ==
Construction of a line from Howrah to Sahibganj, for the proposed Howrah–Delhi link, started in 1851. The first Howrah–Delhi line via what later became the Sahibganj loop was opened in 1866. With the completion of the Raniganj-Kiul section, the shorter Howrah–Delhi main line via Patna was in place in 1871. The Sitarampur–Gaya–Mughalsarai Grand Chord, which shortened the Howrah–Delhi distance even further, was completed in 1901 but was formally inaugurated by Lord Minto, then Viceroy and Governor General of India with a function on 6 December 1906.

== Electrification ==
Howrah–Bardhaman chord was electrified in 1964–66. The Bardhaman–Mankar–Waria sector in 1964–66, the Waria–Asansol sector in 1960−61, the Asansol to Gaya sector in 1960–62, the Gaya–Mughalsarai sector in 1962, the Mughalsarai–Kanpur sector in 1964–69 and the Kanpur–New Delhi sector in 1966–1977.

The Howrah–Gaya–Delhi route was the first trunk route in India to be completely electrified (AC traction).

In 1965, Asansol–Bareilly Passenger was the first long-distance train on Eastern Railway to be hauled by an AC loco.

== Speed limits ==
Most of the Howrah–Gaya–Delhi line is classified as ‘A’ class line where trains can run up to 160 km per hour but in certain sections speeds may be limited to 120–130 km per hour. The Howrah Rajdhani (between Howrah and New Delhi) travels at an average speed of 85.8 km per hour and the Sealdah Rajdhani (between Sealdah and New Delhi) travels at an average speed of 82.70 km per hour.

The Rajdhani Express ran for the first time in 1969 from New Delhi to Howrah. It took 17 hours 20 minutes to cover the distance of 1,445 km.

The first Duronto non-stop express was launched on 18 September 2009, between Sealdah and New Delhi. It was followed by several such trains between other stations.

The first double-decker superfast train commenced running between Howrah and Dhanbad on 1 October 1970.

== Passenger movement ==
New Delhi, Aligarh, Kanpur Central, Allahabad, Mughalsarai, Gaya, Dhanbad, Asansol and Howrah, on this line, are amongst the top hundred booking stations of Indian Railway.

== Railway reorganisation ==
In 1952, Eastern Railway, Northern Railway and North Eastern Railway were formed. Eastern Railway was formed with a portion of East Indian Railway Company, east of Mughalsarai and Bengal Nagpur Railway. Northern Railway was formed with a portion of East Indian Railway Company west of Mughalsarai, Jodhpur Railway, Bikaner Railway and Eastern Punjab Railway. North Eastern Railway was formed with Oudh and Tirhut Railway, Assam Railway and a portion of Bombay, Baroda and Central India Railway. East Central Railway was created in 1996–97. North Central Railway was formed in 2003.

== Golden quadrilateral ==
The Howrah–Gaya–Delhi line is a part of the golden quadrilateral. The routes connecting the four major metropolises (New Delhi, Mumbai, Chennai and Kolkata), along with their diagonals, known as the golden quadrilateral, carry about half the freight and nearly half the passenger traffic, although they form only 16 per cent of the length.

== Major trains on this route ==
1. Howrah Rajdhani Express (via Gaya)
2. Sealdah Rajdhani Express
3. Poorva Express (via Gaya)
4. Kalka Mail – The oldest running passenger train of India
5. Kolkata Mail via Allahabad

and many more

== See also ==
- NH 19 linking Delhi and Kolkata
