= Pandit Deen Dayal Upadhyaya Junction railway station =

Railway station in the Indian state of Uttar Pradesh

Pandit Deen Dayal Upadhyaya Junction Mughalsarai Junction

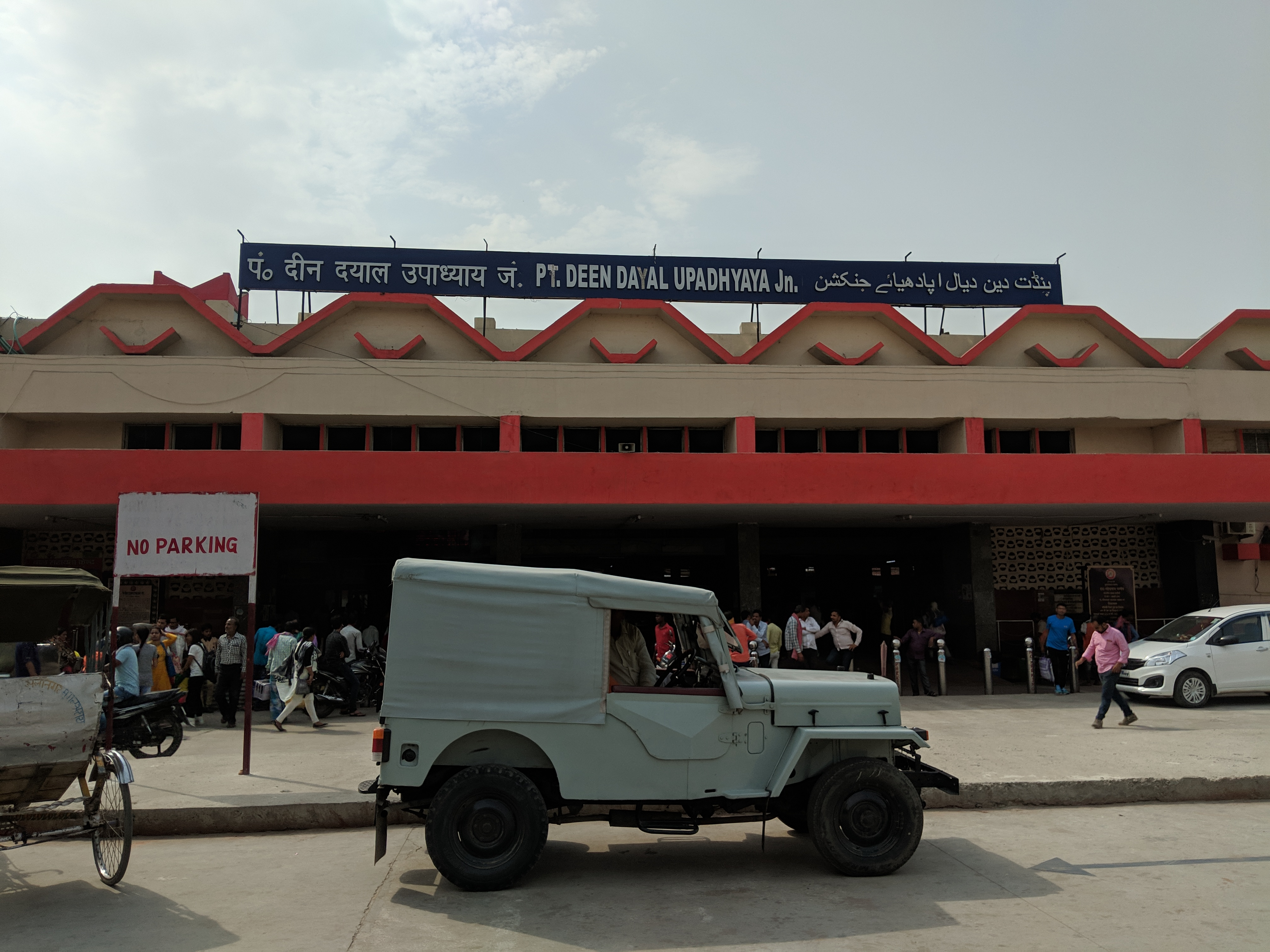
- Pandit Deendayal Upadhyaya Junction entrance

General information
- Location: Mughalsarai 232101, Uttar Pradesh; India
- Coordinates: 25°16′36″N 83°07′02″E
- Elevation: 79.273 metres (260.08 ft)
- System: Inter-city and regional rail station
- Owner: Indian Railways
- Operator: East Central Railways
- Lines: New Delhi–Howrah main line, New Delhi–Gaya–Howrah main line, Howrah–Prayagraj–Mumbai line, Gaya–Pandit Deen Dayal Upadhyaya Junction section, Pandit Deen Dayal Upadhyaya Junction – Kanpur section, Grand Chord, Patna–Mughalsarai section
- Platforms: 8
- Tracks: 23
- Connections: Auto stand, taxi stand

Construction
- Structure type: Standard on ground
- Parking: Yes
- Cycle facilities: Yes

Other information
- Status: Functioning
- Station code: DDU (formerly MGS)
- Zone(s): East Central Railway zone
- Division(s): Pandit Deen Dayal Upadhyaya

History
- Opened: 1862; 164 years ago
- Closed: -
- Rebuilt: -
- Electrified: 1961–63
- Former names: Mughalsarai Junction

Passengers
- 3 lakh per day
Location
- Location within Uttar Pradesh Location within India
- Interactive map of Pandit Deen Dayal Upadhyaya Junction

Pandit Deen Dayal Upadhyaya Junction railway station, formerly known as Mughalsarai Junction railway station, (station code: DDU, old code MGS) is a railway station in the town of Mughalsarai in the Indian state of Uttar Pradesh. The station contains the largest railway marshaling yard in Asia. This yard caters to around 450–500 trains in a month. All trains, including premium category Vande Bharat, Rajdhani and Duronto trains, halt at this station, which makes it unique in the entire Indian Railways network. Major installations in Mughalsarai include electric locomotive shed holding 147 locomotives, diesel locomotive shed holding 53 locomotives, wagon ROH shed, and a 169-bed divisional hospital.

== The name of the station ==
On the evening of 10 February 1968, barely two months after he was elected president of the Bharatiya Jana Sangh, Deen Dayal Upadhyaya boarded the Sealdah Express from Lucknow to Patna. A few hours later, his body was found near a pole a few hundred feet from the end of a platform at Mughalsarai station. What followed was a long and involved investigation into what the Sangh and people insisted was a politically motivated murder by the ruling party. A CBI probe initiated by ruling party called it an accident; two men confessed to pushing him out of the train in a robbery attempt but were acquitted when it was found out to be made under duress; there was no sign of struggle or injury on Upadhyay's person. And conspiracy theories about power battles by Congress against the Sangh still abound. In 1992, then government of the state of Uttar Pradesh attempted to rename Mughalsarai after Deen Dayal Upadhyaya However, the plan was shelved when Kalyan Singh, the chief minister was forced to resign after an outbreak of violence in the state following the Babri Masjid demolition. In 2017, the Government of India approved a fresh proposal forwarded by the Yogi Adityanath-led state government to rename the station. The station was officially renamed as Pandit Deen Dayal Upadhyaya Junction on 4 June 2018.

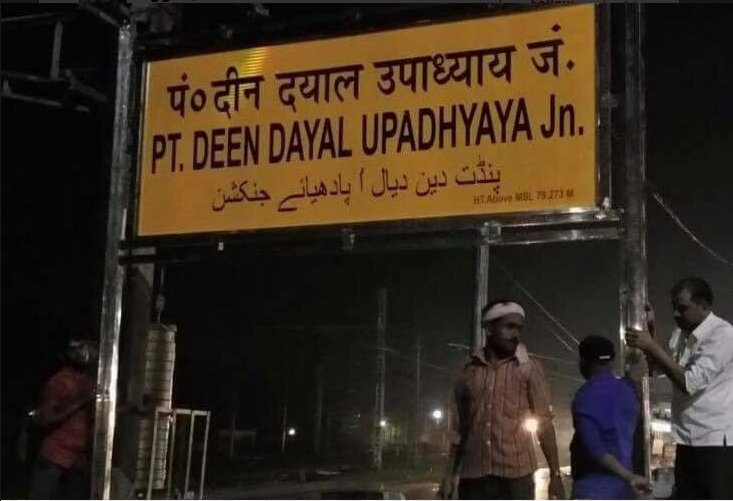
New platform sign

== Electrification ==
The Gaya–Mughalsarai Junction section was electrified in 1961–63. Mughalsarai yard was electrified in 1963–65.

== Marshalling yard ==
Mughalsarai marshalling yard is the largest in Asia. It is 12.5 km long and handles around 1,500 wagons daily. Wagon handling has come down after the railways discontinued piecemeal loading. At its peak, it handled 5,000 wagons a day. Of all divisions on Indian Railways, Mughalsarai Division deals the most intense train operations – both Goods and Coaching. It is the bridge between Eastern part and Northern part of India. It closes the distance between pit head coal and power house, finished steel product to user, food grain and fertiliser to eastern part of the country and other raw material to industries. The operational efficiency of the division plays a pivotal role in determining the efficiency of the East Central Railway and any setback or inefficiency in operations on this division is a sensitive matter which affects the overall operations of the Railways. Because of its crucial importance, the Railway Board keeps a special watch on Mughalsarai division's operations.

== Sheds and workshops ==
Mughal Sarai diesel loco shed is home to WDM-2, WDM-3A and WDS-5 diesel locos. The diesel shed also holds 50 electric locos, all of them WAG-7. There was a Northern Railway diesel loco shed at Mughalsarai. It was decommissioned in 2001. Mughalsarai electric loco shed can hold more than 150 electric locos. Amongst them are WAP-4 and more than 70 WAG-7 locos. The electric shed has recently started holding WAG-9 locomotives.

The largest wagon repair workshop of Indian Railways is located at Mughalsarai.

== Passenger movement ==
Pandit Deen Dayal Upadhyaya Junction is amongst the top hundred booking stations of Indian Railways.

== Electric Loco Shed, DDUE ==
Serial No.	Locomotive Class	Horsepower	Quantity
1.	WAP-4	5350	11
2.	WAG-7	5350	120
3.	WAG-9	6120	2
4.	WAG-9H	6000-6350	196
Total Locomotives Active as of November 2026			419

== Diesel Loco Shed, DDUX ==
Serial No.	Locomotive Class	Horsepower	Quantity
1.	WAG-7	5350	87
2.	WDG-3A	3100	9
Total Locomotives Active as of November 2026			96

== Amenities ==
Pandit Deen Dayal Upadhyaya Junction railway station has 2 AC rooms, 4 non-AC retiring rooms, and a ten-bedded non-AC dormitory. It has a food plaza and a ‘Jan Aahar’ (affordable food) facility. The station has ATMs of nationalised banks.

== Gallery ==
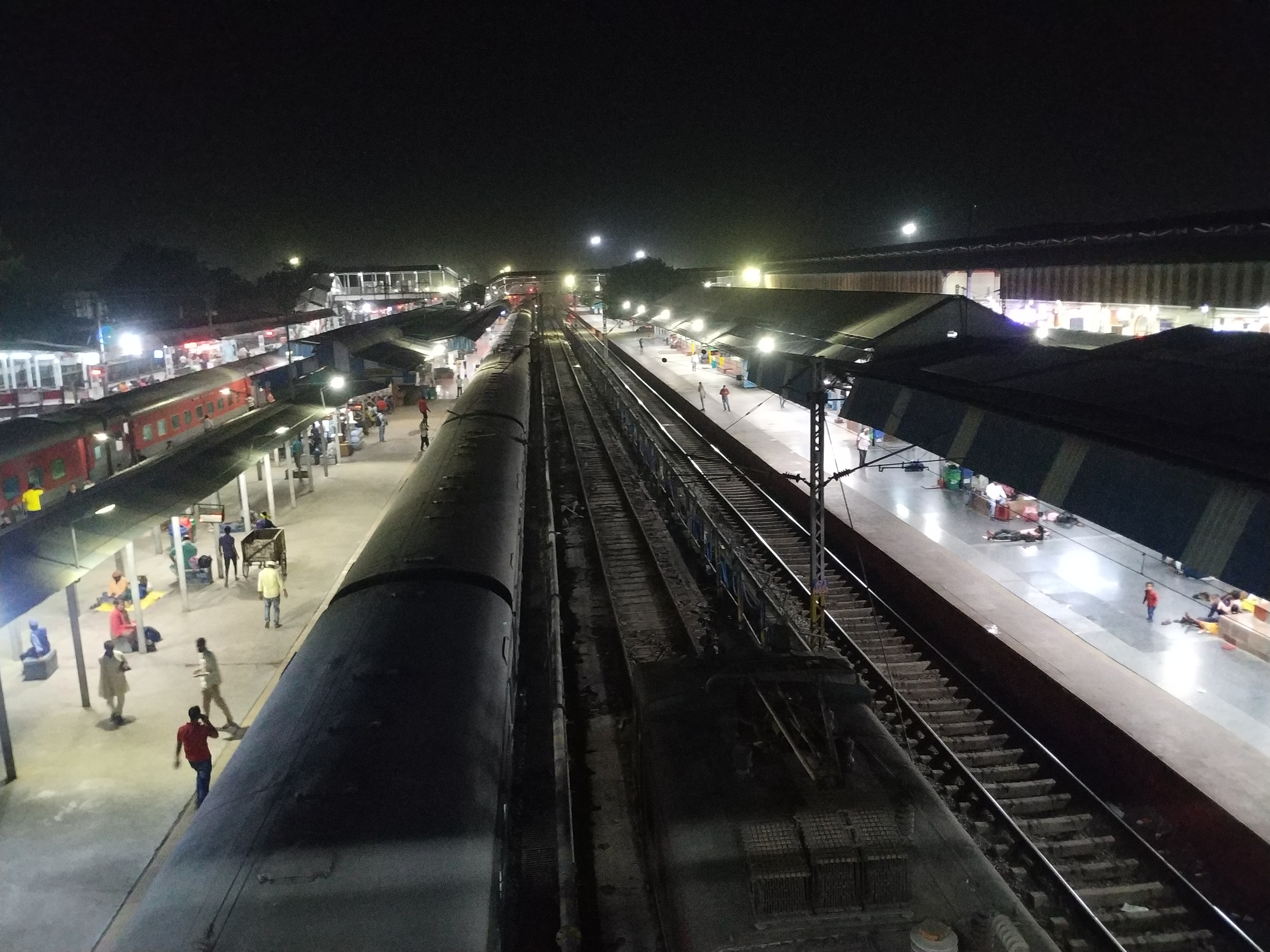
Platform 4 and 5 of Mughalsarai Junction from flyover

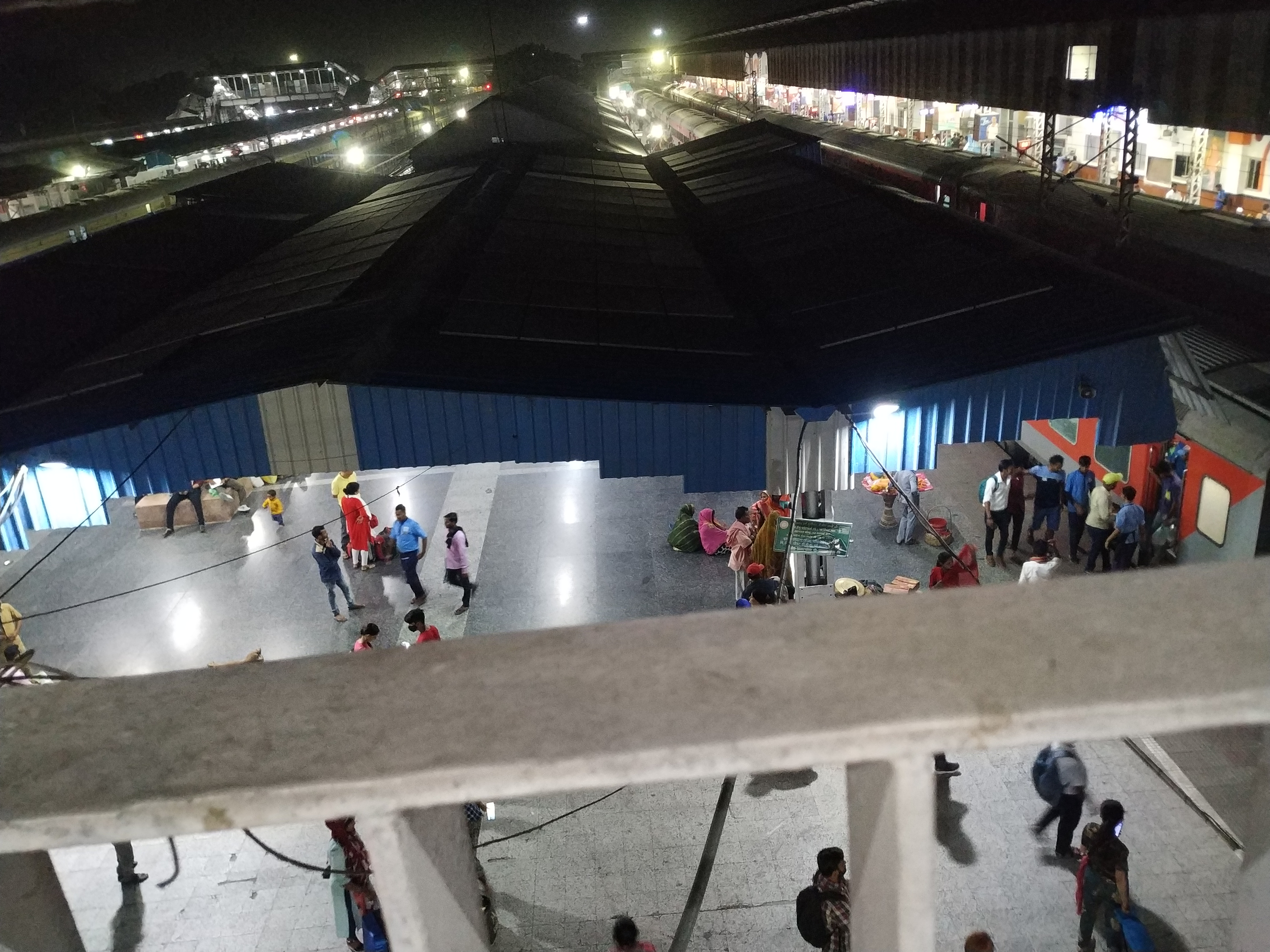
A view of Mughalsarai Junction as seen from flyover.

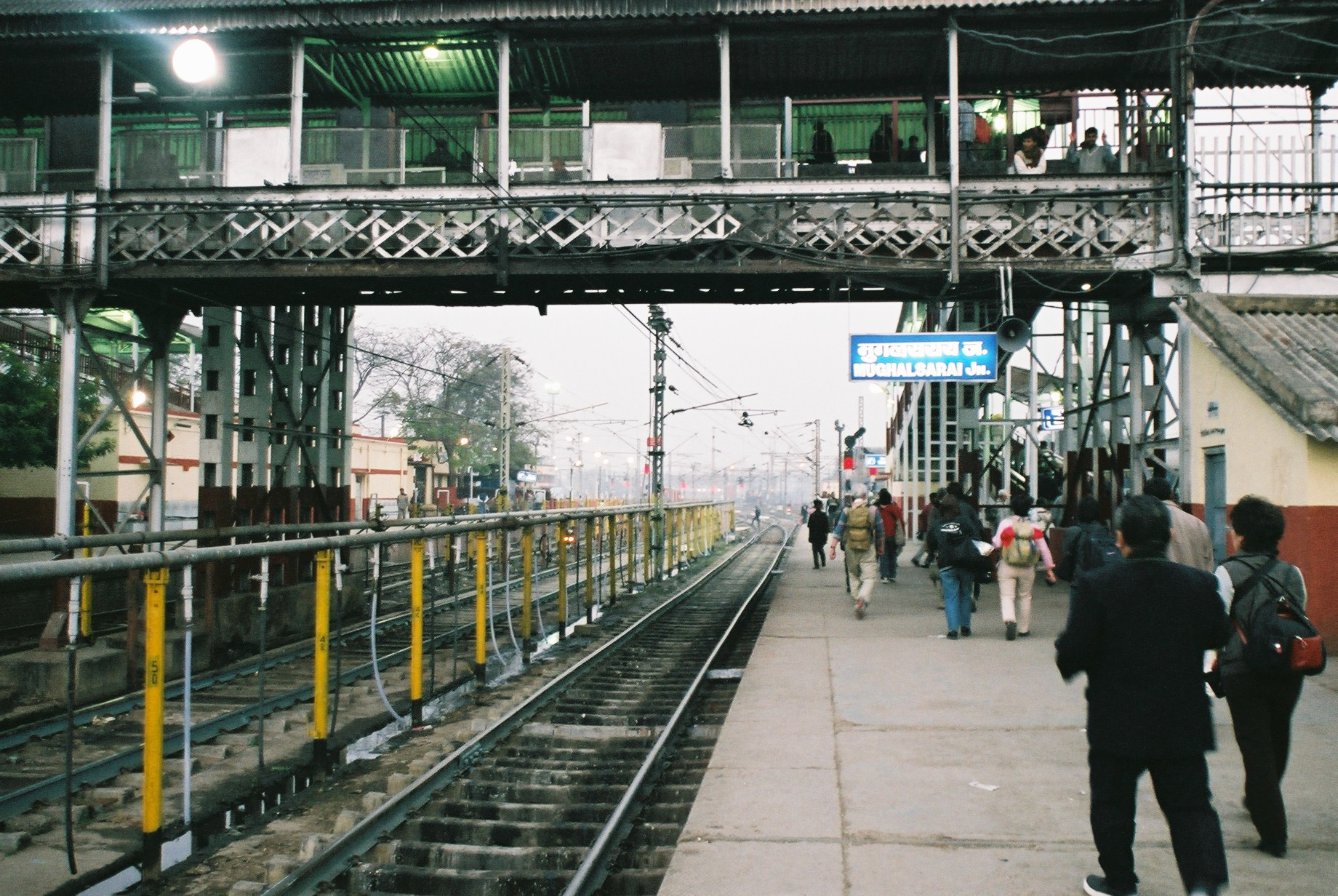
Inside Mughalsarai Junction station

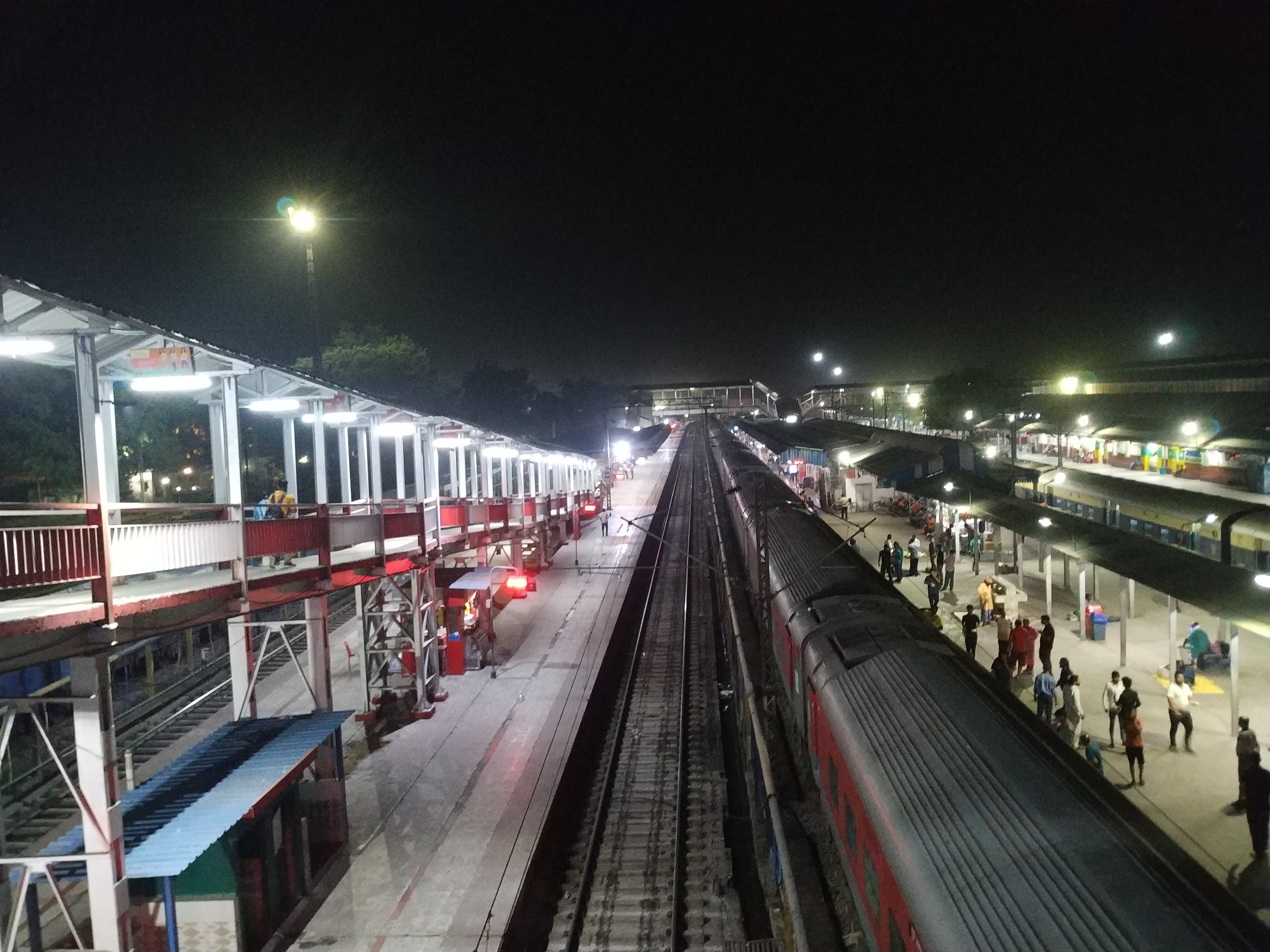
Platform 7 of Mughalsarai Junction.

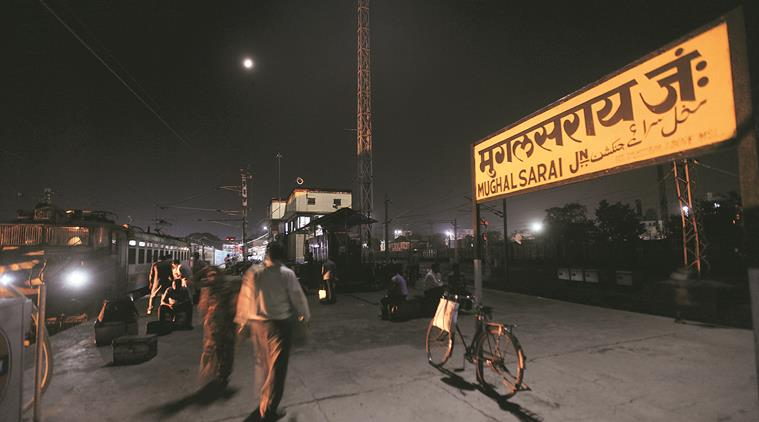
Mughalsarai Junction board.

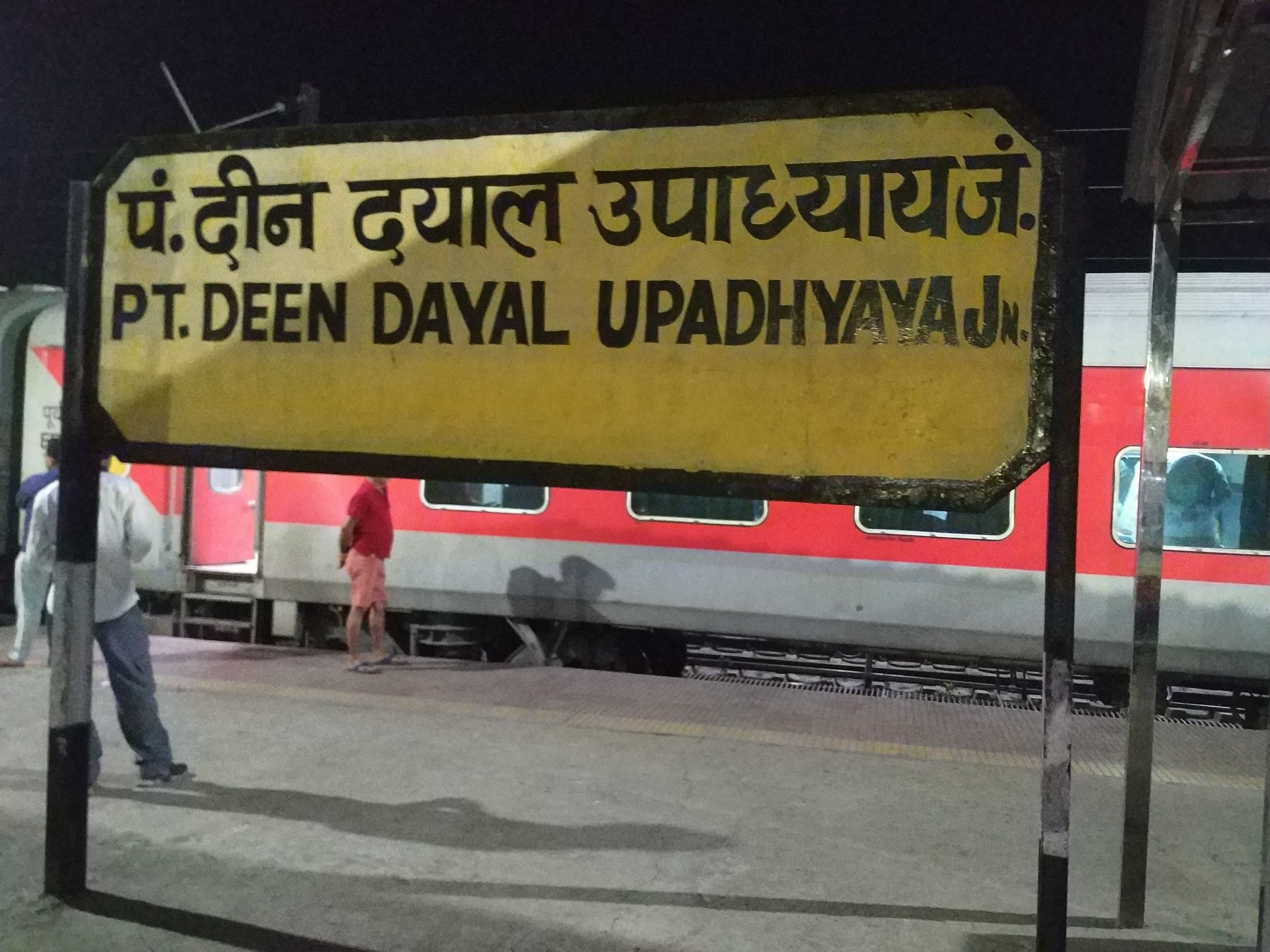
Board of showing the new name of the station: "Pt. Deen Dayal Upadhyaya Junction"

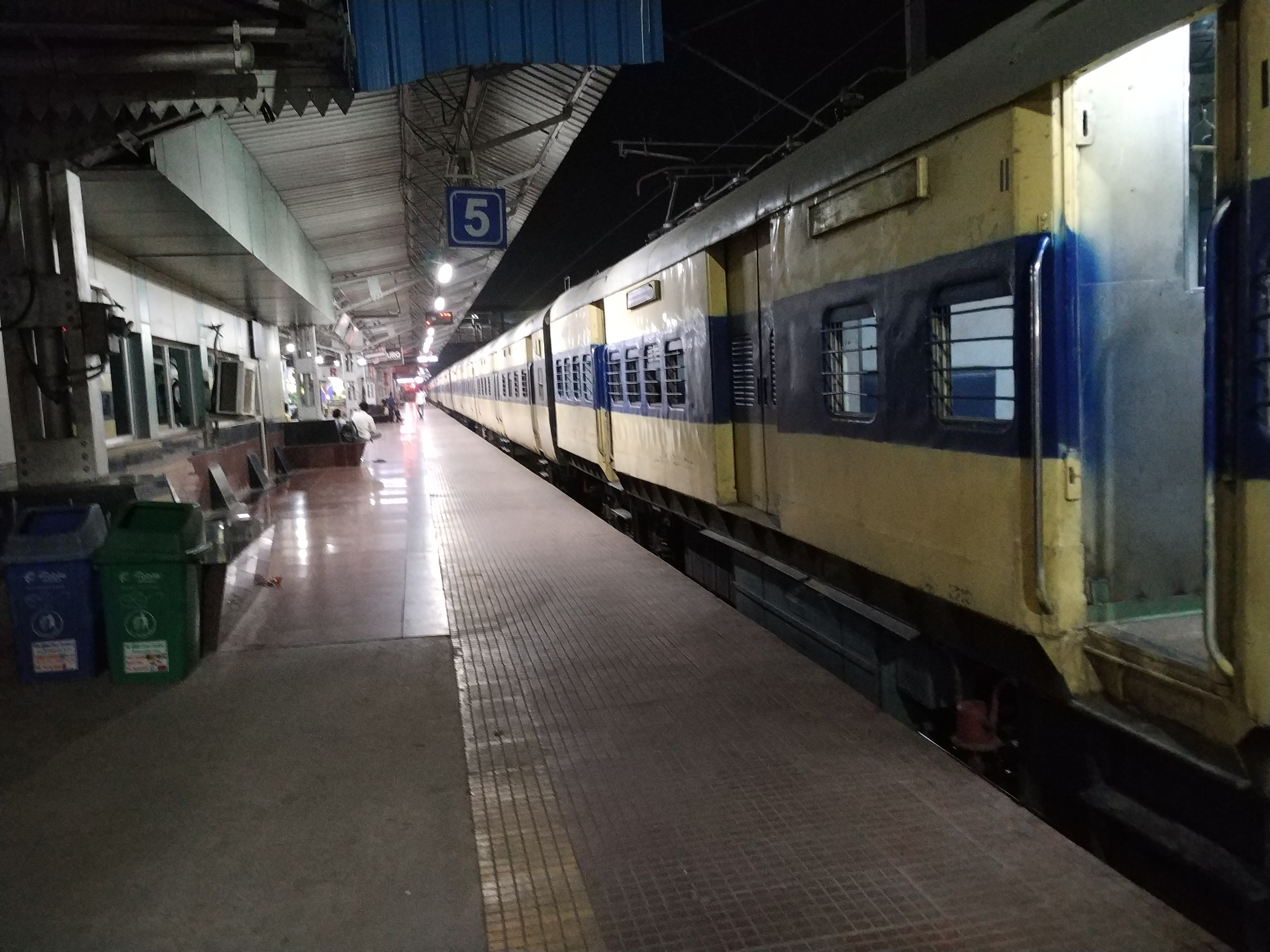
Local Train on Platform 5 of Mughalsarai Junction.

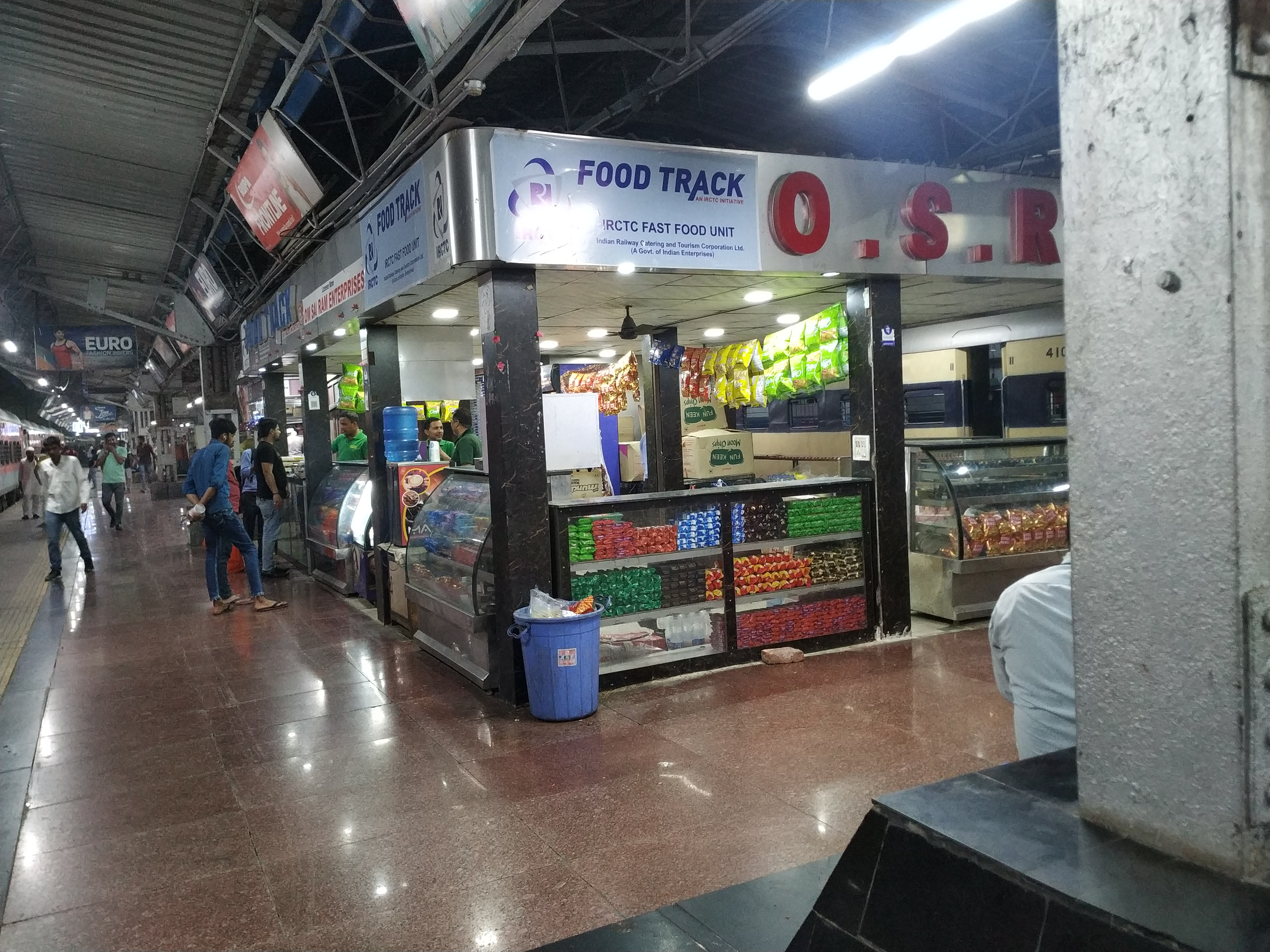
Food Track at Mughalsarai Junction platform 6

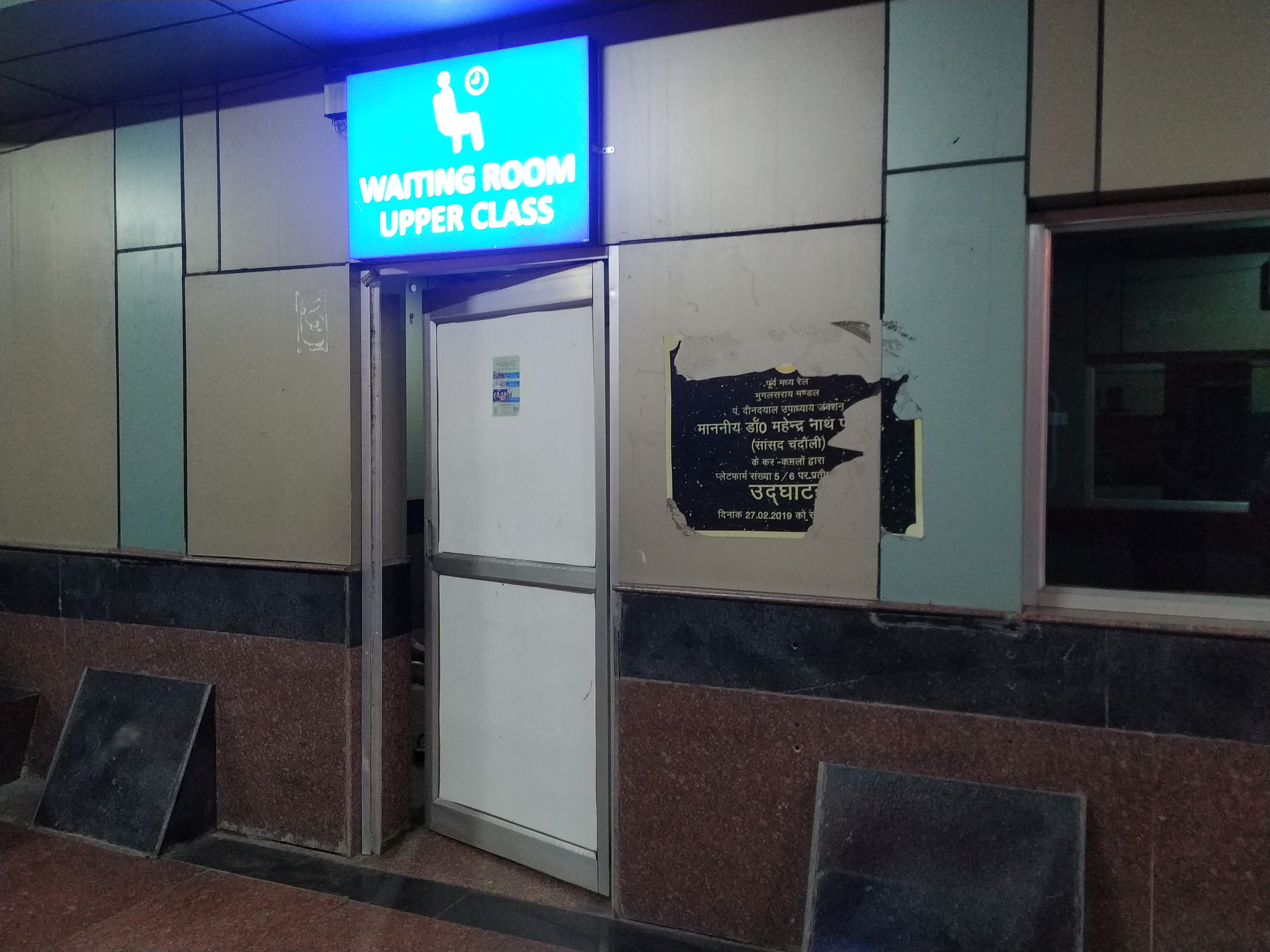
Upper Class waiting room at Platform 6 of Mughalsarai Junction

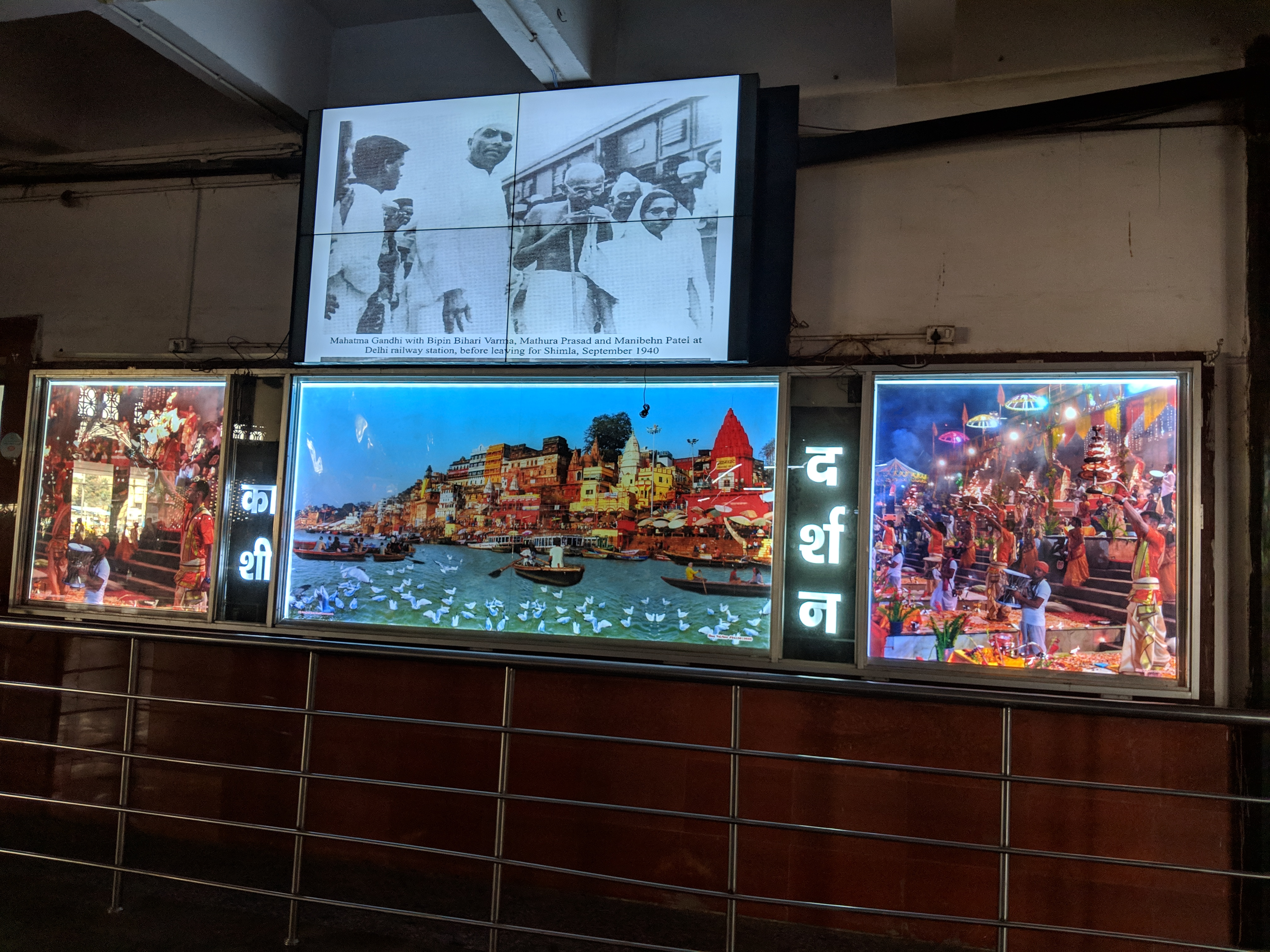

== See also ==
- Varanasi Junction railway station
- Varanasi City railway station
- Kashi railway station
- Banaras railway station
- Kerakat railway station
- Gaya Junction railway station
- Dhanbad Junction railway station

Preceding station	Indian Railways	Following station
Kuchman towards ?	East Central Railway zone Howrah–Delhi main line	Jeonathpur towards ?
Ganjkhwaja towards ?	East Central Railway zone Grand Chord line	Jeonathpur towards ?
Terminus	East Central Railway zone Mughalsarai–Varanasi–Lucknow line	Vyasnagar towards ?
