= Grand Chord =

Indian railway route

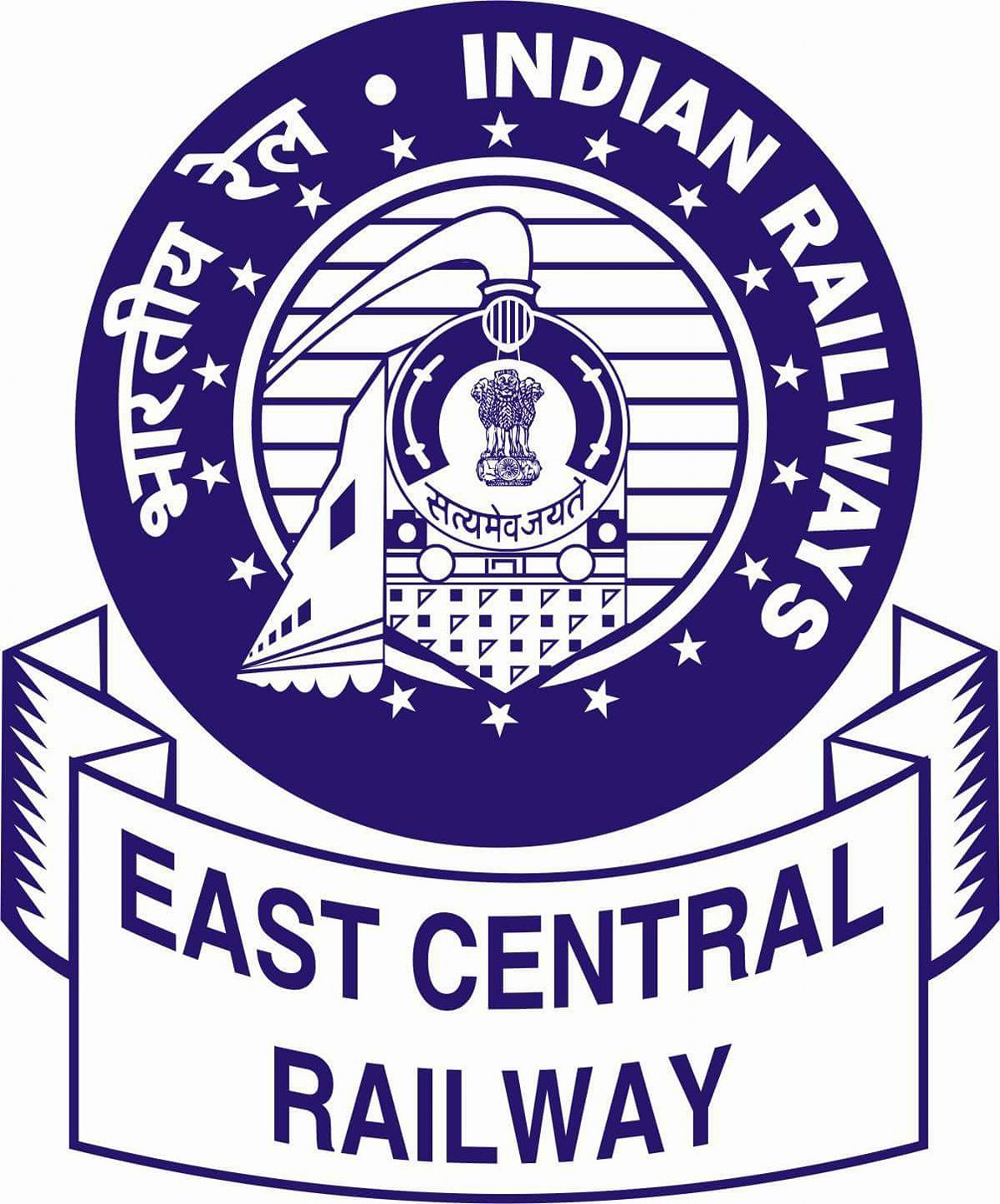
- Eastern Central Railway, one of the zones responsible for managing this line

Overview
- Status: Operational
- Owner: Indian Railways
- Locale: West Bengal, Jharkhand, Bihar, and Uttar Pradesh
- Termini: Sitarampur; Pandit Deen Dayal Upadhyaya Junction

Service
- Operator(s): Eastern Railway, East Central Railway

History
- Opened: 1900

Technical
- Line length: 450.7 km (280 mi)
- Num of tracks: 2/3
- Track gauge: 5 ft 6 in (1,676 mm) broad gauge
- Electrification: Electrified
- Operating speed: up to 180 km/h (110 mph)

Grand Chord is a railway route in India that forms part of the New Delhi–Gaya–Howrah main line. It connects Sitarampur in West Bengal with Pandit Deen Dayal Upadhyaya Junction in Uttar Pradesh through Jharkhand and Bihar.

The route is about 450 km (280 mi) long and is used by both passenger and freight trains. It is an important route for trains running between eastern and northern India and carries a large amount of freight, including coal and other goods.

The Grand Chord was built as a shorter route between Howrah and Delhi. The section between Gaya and Mughalsarai was opened in 1906, completing the direct route between the two cities.

The East Central Railway manages the route.
