= Pandit Deen Dayal Upadhyaya railway division =

Railway division of India

Pt. Deen Dayal Upadhyaya railway division (formerly Mughalsarai railway division) is one of the five railway divisions under the jurisdiction of East Central Railway zone of the Indian Railways. This railway division was formed on 5 November 1951 and its headquarter is located at Mughalsarai in the state of Uttar Pradesh of India. Pandit Deen Dayal Upadhyaya Junction and Gaya Junction are most busiest station in term of passenger then followed by Dehri-on-Sone, Anugrah Narayan Road and Sasaram. This station holds record for most number of stoppage of Rajdhani Express trains in India.

Danapur railway division, Dhanbad railway division, Samastipur railway division, and Sonpur railway division are the other railway divisions under ECR Zone headquartered at Hajipur.

The official name was changed from Mughalsarai railway division to Pt. Deen Dayal Upadhyaya railway division on 19 January 2020 in honour of Jan Sangh party leader Deen Dayal Upadhyaya whose dead body was found near the railway station on 11 February 1968. Upadhayay was travelling by train from Lucknow to Patna. The official name of Mughalsarai Junction was changed to Pt Deen Dayal Upadhyaya Junction in 2018.

== List of railway stations and towns ==
The list includes the stations under the Mughalsarai railway division and their station category.

| Category of station | No. of stations | Names of stations |
|---|---|---|
| A-1 | 2 | Pandit Deen Dayal Upadhyaya Junction, Gaya Junction |
| A | 3 | Anugraha Narayan Road, Dehri-on-Sone, Sasaram |
| B | 1 | Bhabua Road |
| C suburban station | 0 | - |
| D | - | |
| E | - | - |
| F halt station | - | - |
| Total | - | - |

Stations closed for Passengers -
