= Pandit Deen Dayal Upadhyaya Junction–Gaya section =

Railway route in India

Gaya–Pandit Deen Dayal Upadhyaya Junction section Gaya–Mughalsarai section
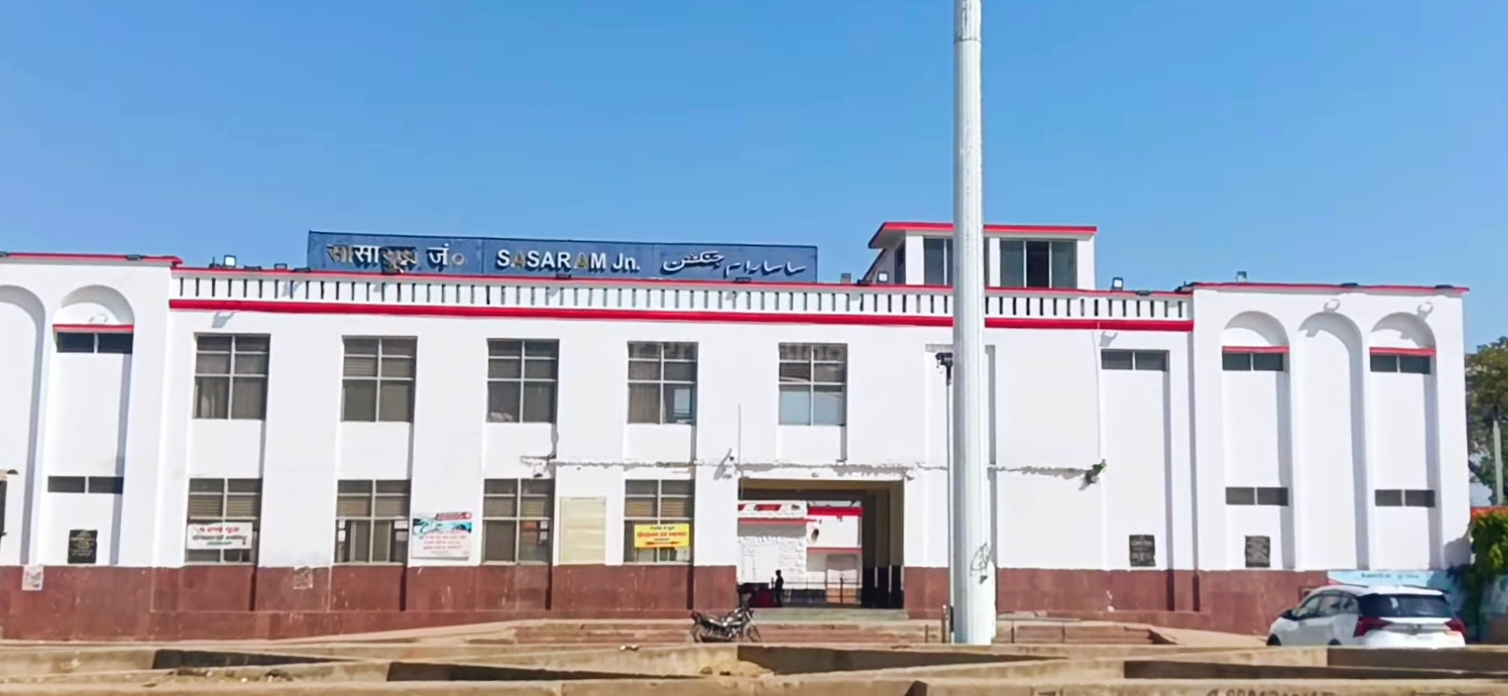
- Sasaram Junction railway station is an important Railway Station on Gaya–Pandit Deen Dayal Upadhyaya Junction section

Overview
- Status: Operational
- Owner: Indian Railways
- Locale: Bihar, Jharkhand, Uttar Pradesh
- Termini: Gaya Junction; Pandit Deen Dayal Upadhyaya Junction
- Stations: 31

Service
- Operator: East Central Railway

History
- Opened: 1907

Technical
- Line length: 197 km (122 mi)
- Number of tracks: 2
- Track gauge: 5 ft 6 in (1,676 mm) broad gauge
- Electrification: electrified in 1962
- Operating speed: up to 130 km/h (81 mph)

The Gaya–Pandit Deen Dayal Upadhyaya Junction section, formerly Gaya–Mughalsarai section , is a railway line connecting Gaya Junction and Pandit Deen Dayal Upadhyaya Junction. This 197-kilometre (122 mi) track is part of the Grand Chord, Howrah–Gaya–Delhi line and Howrah–Prayagraj–Mumbai line. This section includes Arrah-Sasaram and Son Nagar branch lines. It is under the jurisdiction of East Central Railway.

== Grand Chord ==
Ever since the railway connection of Delhi with Howrah in 1866, the East Indian Railway Company was making regular efforts to reduce the distance of the Howrah–Delhi main line. After a survey in 1888-89 and two more subsequently, a route was determined from Dhanbad to Mughal Sarai via Koderma and Gaya. The major works in this section were a bridge across the Son River at Dehri, and tunnelling and ghat line construction between Gurpa and Gujhandi. The Grand Chord was opened in 1907. Even when the Grand Chord was under construction, the Son Nagar-Daltonganj branch line was opened in 1902.

== Bridging the Soane/Son ==
The total length of the Upper Sone Bridge across the Soane, as the river was then called, over abutments is 3,064 metres (10,052 ft). It was opened for traffic on 27 February 1900. When it was built, it was the longest bridge in India and was believed to be the second longest bridge in the world, short of the Tay Bridge near Dundee. Subsequently, longer road bridges were built but it remained the longest rail bridge in India for many years. The opening of the 4.62 km Vembanad Rail Bridge, connecting the Container Transshipment Terminal on Vallarpadam Island to Edappally, in February 2011, pushed it to the second position.

== Electrification ==
The Gaya–Pandit Deen Dayal Upadhyaya Junction section was electrified in 1962. In 1965, Asansol–Bareilly Passenger was the first long-distance train on Eastern Railway hauled by an AC loco.

== Arrah–Sasaram ==
The Arrah–Sasaram line was opened as a narrow gauge (2 ft 6 in (762 mm)) section of Martin's Light Railways in 1914 and was closed in 1978. A new broad-gauge line was laid by Indian Railways from Sasaram to Arrah in 2006–07.

== Speed limits ==
Most of the Gaya–Pandit Deen Dayal Upadhyaya Junction section is classified as 'A' class line where trains can run up to 160 km per hour but in certain sections speeds may be limited to 120–130 km per hour. The Howrah Rajdhani (between Howrah and New Delhi) travels at an average speed of 85.8 km per hour and the Sealdah Rajdhani (between Sealdah and New Delhi) travels at an average speed of 84.70 km per hour.

== Freight corridor ==
Son Nagar is expected to be connected with Ludhiana as part of the Eastern Corridor. The primary feeder routes for this will be from Sonnagar to Durgapur via Gomoh, Sonnagar to Tatanagar via Garhwa Road, and Barkakana to Bokaro via Chandrapura.

== Railway reorganisation ==
In 1952, Eastern Railway, Northern Railway and North Eastern Railway were formed. Eastern Railway was formed with a portion of East Indian Railway Company, east of Mughalsarai and Bengal Nagpur Railway. Northern Railway was formed with a portion of East Indian Railway Company west of Mughalsarai, Jodhpur Railway, Bikaner Railway and Eastern Punjab Railway. North Eastern Railway was formed with Oudh and Tirhut Railway, Assam Railway and a portion of Bombay, Baroda and Central India Railway. East Central Railway was created in 1996–97.
