= Slz =

SLZ, slz, or other variations may refer to:

== Places ==
- IATA code for Marechal Cunha Machado International Airport, São Luís, Maranhão, Brazil
- Postal code for San Lawrenz, Malta
- San Lorenzo High School (SLz), Ashland, California, USA
  - San Lorenzo Unified School District (SLz USD), Ashland, California, USA
- Station code for Solari railway station, Khordha, Odisha, India

== Other uses ==
- SLZ Group, a Swiss financial services company
- ISO 639 code for the Maʼya language, an Austronesian language spoken in Indonesia
- Mineral code for Scholzite, see List of mineral symbols
- Schweizerische Lehrerzeitung, a Swiss newspaper published by Conzett & Huber (publishing house)
- ICAO code for Super Luza, an Angolan airline; see List of airline codes (S)

== See also ==
- San Lorenzo (sLz), Spanish for Saint Lawrence
- São Luiz (sLz), Portuguese for Saint Louis
