= Gadadharpur =

Village in Birbhum, West Bengal

- Village
- Location in West Bengal, India Gadadharpur (India)
- Coordinates: 24.013249°N 87.692816°E
- Country: India
- State: West Bengal
- District: Birbhum
- Subdivision: Sainthia

Government
  - Type: Panchayat
  - Body: Bajitpur Gram Panchayat

Population (2011)
  - Total: 893

Languages
  - Official: Bengali, Hindi (very minor)
- Time zone: UTC+5:30 (IST)
- Vehicle registration: WB

Gadadharpur is a village in the Sainthia subdivision of Birbhum district, West Bengal, India. It falls under the jurisdiction of Bajitpur Gram Panchayat. The nearest town is Sainthia, located about 11 km away by road and 8 km via a shortcut bridge.

== History ==
Gadadharpur is located near Sainthia, where a significant railway accident took place. The 2010 Sainthia train accident occurred on 19 July 2010, when the Uttar Banga Express collided with the Vananchal Express at Sainthia Junction railway station. The accident resulted in at least 66 fatalities and more than 150 injuries, making it one of the worst railway disasters in West Bengal in recent decades.

== Demographics ==
According to the 2011 Census of India, Gadadharpur had a total population of 893, of which 465 were males and 428 females. There were about 220 households. The literacy rate was approximately 68%.

== Transport ==
Gadadharpur is connected by road through the National Highway 114, which links nearby towns including Sainthia. The nearest railway station is Gadadharpur Railway Station (GHLE).

== Education ==
The village has educational institutions including:

- Gadadharpur Bazar Jr. High School
- Gadadharpur Bazar Primary & Junior High School Cluster

== Administration ==
Gadadharpur comes under the jurisdiction of Sainthia police station. It is also part of the Sainthia Municipality area. The official village profile is listed under Bajitpur Gram Panchayat records.
