= Kendrapara Road railway station =

Railway station on the East Coast Railway network, India

Kendrapara Road

General information
- Location: Jagatpur, Odisha; India
- Coordinates: 20°29′53″N 85°55′04″E
- Elevation: 27 metres (89 ft)
- System: Indian Railways station
- Owner: Ministry of Railways, Indian Railways
- Line: Howrah–Chennai main line
- Platforms: 4
- Tracks: 4

Construction
- Structure type: Standard (on ground)
- Parking: No

Other information
- Status: Functioning
- Station code: KNPR
- Zone(s): East Coast Railway
- Division(s): Khurda Road

Services
Preceding station	Indian Railways	Following station
Manguli Chowdwar towards Howrah Junction	East Coast Railway zone Howrah–Chennai main line	Cuttack Junction towards Chennai Central
Location
- Location within India Location within Odisha

Kendrapara Road railway station is a railway station on the East Coast Railway network in the state of Odisha, India. It serves Jagatpur area of Cuttack. Its code is KNPR. It has two platforms. Passenger, MEMU, Express trains halt at Kendrapara Road railway station.

== Major trains ==
- East Coast Express

== See also ==
- Cuttack district
