= Nergundi Junction railway station =

Railway station in Odisha, India

Nergundi Junction

General information
- Location: Nergundi, Odisha; India
- Coordinates: 20°32′11″N 85°57′33″E
- System: Indian Railways station
- Owner: Ministry of Railways, Indian Railways
- Line: Howrah–Chennai main line
- Platforms: 4
- Tracks: 7

Construction
- Structure type: Standard (on ground)
- Parking: No

Other information
- Status: Functioning
- Station code: NRG
- Zone(s): East Coast Railway
- Division(s): Khurda Road
Location
- Location within India Location within Odisha

Nergundi Junction railway station is a railway station on the East Coast Railway network in the state of Odisha, India. It serves Nergundi town. Its code is NRG. It has three platforms. Passenger, MEMU, Express trains halt at Nergundi Junction railway station.

== Major trains ==
- Howrah–Puri Express

== See also ==
- Cuttack district
