= Argul, Nizamabad district =

Coordinates: 18°44′N 78°16′E

Argul is a village in Jakranpalle mandal, Nizamabad district, Telangana, India. As of 2001 the population of the village was 4,026 people spread over 932 households.
