= Khurda Road–Visakhapatnam section =

Railway section in India

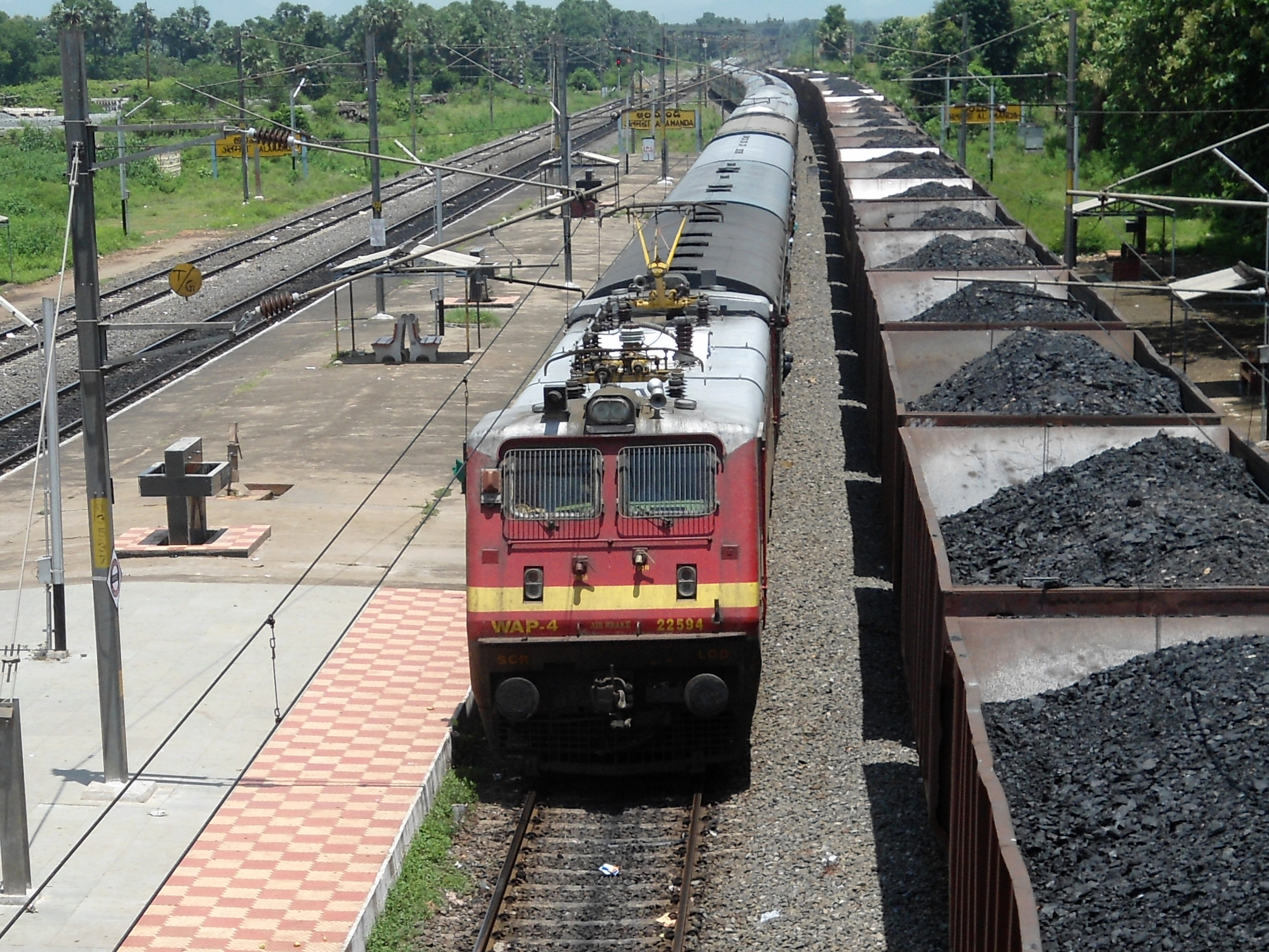
- 18463 Prashanti Express at Alamanda railway station on Khurda Road–Visakhapatnam section

Overview
- Status: Operational
- Owner: Indian Railways
- Locale: Odisha, Andhra Pradesh
- Termini: Khurda Road; Visakhapatnam

Service
- Operator(s): South Coast Railway , East Coast Railway

History
- Opened: 1899

Technical
- Track length: 424 km (263 mi)
- Number of tracks: 2
- Track gauge: 5 ft 6 in (1,676 mm) broad gauge
- Minimum radius: search
- Electrification: Yes
- Operating speed: 130 km/h

The Khurda Road–Visakhapatnam section is a railway line connecting Khurda Road in the Indian state of Odisha and Visakhapatnam in Andhra Pradesh. The main line is part of the Howrah–Chennai main line.

== Geography ==
The Khurda Road–Visakhapatnam section traverses the Eastern Coastal Plains, first the southern part of the Odisha plains from the Mahanadi River Delta to a little beyond Chilika Lake and then the Northern Circars. The coastal plains lie between the Eastern Ghats and the Bay of Bengal and at places the Eastern Ghats come close to the sea. This area has a number of rivers flowing into the sea – Rushikulya, Vamsadhara and Nagavali.

=== Port development ===
Visakhapatnam Port at the mouth of the Meghadrigedda was opened in 1933. It was initially developed by Bengal Nagpur Railway. The port has an inner harbour and an outer harbour. Visakhapatnam port handled 68.04 million tonnes of cargo in 2010–11, which was the second highest in India after Kandla. Visakhapatnam port is being upgraded to handle ships up to 200,000 DWT.

Gangavaram Port came up in 2008 and is claimed to be deepest port in India, which can handle ships up to 200,000 DWT.

A minor port is proposed to be developed at Bheemunipatnam, near the mouth of the Gosthani River.

Gopalpur-on-Sea is being developed into a deep sea port capable of handling ships up to 120,000 DWT.

== History ==
=== Howrah–Chennai main line ===
During the period 1893 to 1896, 1,287 km (800 mi) of railway tracks covering the entire coastal stretch from Cuttack to Vijayawada, was built and opened to traffic by East Coast State Railway.Bengal Nagpur Railway's line to Cuttack was opened on 1 January 1899. The southern part of the East Coast State Railway (from Waltair to Vijayawada) was taken over by Madras Railway in 1901. The 514 km (319 mi)-long northern portion of the East Coast line to Cuttack, including the branch line to Puri, was taken over by Bengal Nagpur Railway in 1902.

=== Branch lines ===
The 79 km (49 mi) Vizianagaram–Parvatipuram line was opened in 1908–09 and an extension to Salur was built in 1913. The Parvatipuram–Raipur line was completed in 1931. (More information is available in the Jharsuguda–Vizianagaram line.)

In 1960, Indian Railway took up three projects: the Kottavalasa–Koraput–Jeypore–Kirandaul line (Dandakaranya Project), the Titlagarh–Bolangir–Jharsuguda Project and the Rourkela–Kiriburu Project. All the three projects taken together were popularly known as the DBK Project or the Dandakaranya Bolangir Kiriburu Project. The Kottavalasa–Kirandaul line was opened in 1966–67.

The Paralakhemedi Light Railway opened the Naupada–Gunupur line between 1900 and 1931. The line was converted to broad gauge in 2011.

=== Railway reorganization ===
The Bengal Nagpur Railway was nationalized in 1944. Eastern Railway was formed on 14 April 1952 with the portion of East Indian Railway Company east of Mughalsarai and the Bengal Nagpur Railway. In 1955, South Eastern Railway was carved out of Eastern Railway. It comprised lines mostly operated by BNR earlier. Amongst the new zones started in April 2003 were East Coast Railway and South East Central Railway. Both these railways were carved out of South Eastern Railway.

== Electrification ==
Howrah–Chennai Mail was the first train in South Eastern Railway to be hauled by a diesel engine (WDM-1) in 1965.

The Khurda–Visakhapatnam section was completely electrified by 2002. The Howrah–Chennai route was completely electrified by 2005.

== Speed limits ==
The entire Kharagpur–Visakhapatnam–Vijayawada main line is classified as a "Group B" line which can take speeds up to 130 km/h. In the branch lines the speed limit is 100 km/h.
