= Khurda Road railway division =

Railway division of India

Khurda Road Division
Overview
- Headquarters: Khurda Road Junction
- Locale: Odisha, India
- Predecessor: East Coast Railway

Other
- Website: East Coast Railways website

Khurda Road railway division is one of the three railway divisions under the jurisdiction of East Coast Railway Zone of the Indian Railways.

== Main lines ==
The main lines of the division are as follows:

Section	Line	Distance
Ichchapuram (exl)-Khurda Road-Bhadrak (B.G. - Double)	Main Line	391 km Route
Khurda Road-Puri (B.G. - Double)	K - P Line	44 km Route
Khurda Road-Mahipur (B.G. - Single)	K - B Line	41 km Route
Barang-Kerejang (B.G. - Double)	K - S Line	102 km Route
Cuttack-Paradeep (B.G. - Double)	C - P Line	82 km Route
Total		660 km Route

== List of railway stations and towns ==
The list includes the stations under the Khurda Road railway division and their station category.

Category of station	No. of stations	Names of stations
A-1 Category	2	Bhubaneswar, Puri
A Category	6	Bhadrak, Brahmapur, Cuttack, Jajpur Keonjhar Road, Khurda Road
B Category	-	-
C Category (Suburban station)	-	-
D Category	-	-
E Category	-	-
F Category; Halt Station	-	-
Total	-	-

Stations closed for Passengers -
