= Puri–Rourkela Vande Bharat Express =

Mini Vande Bharat Express train route in India

Puri - Rourkela Junction Vande Bharat Express

Overview
- Service type: Vande Bharat Express
- Locale: Odisha
- First service: 24 September 2023 (Inaugural run); 25 September 2023; 2 years ago (Commercial run)
- Current operator: East Coast Railways (ECoR)

Route
- Termini: Puri (PURI); Rourkela Junction (ROU)
- Stops: 9
- Distance travelled: 505 km (314 mi)
- Average journey time: 07hrs 45mins
- Service frequency: Six days a week (Note: Except Tuesdays)
- Train number: 20836 / 20835
- Lines used: Tatanagar-Bilaspur line (Rourkela-Jharsuguda); Jharsuguda-Vizianagaram line (till Sarla Jn); Cuttack–Sambalpur line Kharagpur-Puri line (from Cuttack Jn)

On-board services
- Classes: AC Chair Car, AC Executive Chair Car
- Seating arrangements: Airline style; Rotatable seats
- Sleeping arrangements: No
- Catering facilities: On-board Catering
- Observation facilities: Large windows in all coaches
- Entertainment facilities: On-board WiFi; Infotainment System; Electric outlets; Reading light; Seat Pockets; Bottle Holder; Tray Table
- Baggage facilities: Overhead racks
- Other facilities: Kavach

Technical
- Rolling stock: Mini Vande Bharat 2.0 (Last service: Aug 06 2025); Vande Bharat 2.0 (First service: Aug 07 2025)
- Track gauge: Indian gauge 1,676 mm (5 ft 6 in) broad gauge
- Electrification: 25 kV 50 Hz AC Overhead line
- Operating speed: 67 km/h (42 mph) (Avg.)
- Average length: 384 metres (1,260 ft) (16 coaches)
- Track owner: Indian Railways
- Rake maintenance: Puri (PURI)

The 20836/20835 Puri - Rourkela Vande Bharat Express is India's 32nd Vande Bharat Express train, connecting the city of Puri and terminating at Rourkela city in Odisha. This train was inaugurated on 24 September 2023 by Prime Minister Narendra Modi via video conference from New Delhi.

== Overview ==
This train is operated by Indian Railways, connecting Puri, Khurda Road Jn, Bhubaneswar, Cuttack Jn, Dhenkanal, Talcher Road, Angul, Rairakhol, Sambalpur City, Jharsuguda Jn and Rourkela Jn. It is currently operated with train numbers 20836/20835 on 6 days a week basis.

== Rakes ==
It is the thirtieth 2nd Generation and eighteenth Mini Vande Bharat 2.0 Express train which was designed and manufactured by the Integral Coach Factory at Perambur, Chennai under the Make in India Initiative.

As per latest updates, this express train currently runs on Saturdays and will not run on Tuesdays. This change took place on June 03 2025, under Indian Railways.

=== Coach Augmentation ===
As of August 2025, this express train was augmented with 8 additional AC coaches and is currently running with Vande Bharat 2.0 trainset in order to meet the surge in passenger demand on this popular route.

== Service ==
The 20836/20835 Puri - Rourkela Jn Vande Bharat Express operates six days a week except Tuesdays, covering a distance of 506 km (314 mi) in a travel time of 7 hours with an average speed of 65 km/h (40 mph). The service has 9 intermediate stops. The Maximum Permissible Speed is 130 km/h (81 mph).

== See also ==
- Vande Bharat Express
- Tejas Express
- Gatimaan Express
- Puri railway station
- Rourkela Junction railway station
