= Bhubaneswar–Dhanbad Express =

Train in India

Bhubaneswar - Dhanbad Express
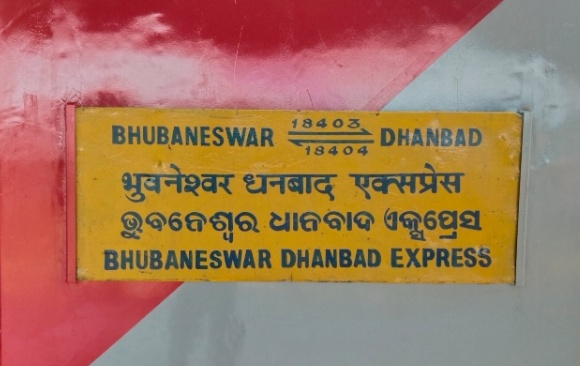

Overview
- Service type: Express
- Status: Active
- Locale: Odisha and Jharkhand
- First service: 1 April 2026; 34 days ago
- Current operator: East Coast Railway (ECoR)

Route
- Termini: Bhubaneswar (BBS); Dhanbad Junction (DHN)
- Stops: 15
- Distance travelled: 776 km (482 mi)
- Average journey time: 14h 35m
- Service frequency: Daily
- Train number: 18403 / 18404

On-board services
- Classes: General Unreserved, Sleeper Class, AC 3rd Class, AC 2nd Class
- Seating arrangements: Yes
- Sleeping arrangements: Yes
- Catering facilities: On-Board Catering; E-Catering
- Observation facilities: Large windows
- Baggage facilities: No
- Other facilities: Below the seats

Technical
- Rolling stock: LHB coach
- Track gauge: 1,676 mm (5 ft 6 in)
- Electrification: 25 kV 50 Hz AC Overhead line
- Operating speed: 130 km/h (81 mph) maximum, 53 km/h (33 mph) average including halts.
- Track owner: Indian Railways

The 18403 / 18404 Bhubaneswar–Dhanbad Express is an express train belonging to East Coast Railway zone that runs between the city Bhubaneswar of Odisha and Dhanbad Junction of Jharkhand in India.

It operates as train number 18403 from Bhubaneswar to Dhanbad Junction and as train number 18404 in the reverse direction, serving the states of Odisha and Jharkhand.

== Services ==
- 18403/ Bhubaneswar–Dhanbad Express has an average speed of 53 km/h and covers 776 km in 14h 35m.
- 18404/ Dhanbad–Bhubaneswar Express has an average speed of 48 km/h and covers 776 km in 16h 15m.

== Route and halts ==
The important halts of the train are :

- Bhubaneswar
- Cuttack Junction
- Dhenkanal
- Talcher Road
- Angul
- Rairakhol
- Sambalpur Junction
- Jharsuguda Junction
- Rourkela Junction
- Hatia
- Ranchi Junction
- Muri Junction
- Bokaro Steel City
- Chandrapura Junction
- Dhanbad Junction

== Schedule ==
- 18403 – 8:25 pm (daily) [Bhubaneswar]
- 18404 – 4:00 pm (daily) [Dhanbad Junction]

== Coach composition ==
1. General Unreserved – 3
2. Sleeper Class – 8
3. AC 3rd Class – 3
4. AC 2nd Class – 1
5. EOG - 1
6. SLRD - 1

Total = 17 LHB Coach

== Traction ==
As the entire route is fully electrified it is hauled by a Howrah Shed-based WAP-7 electric locomotive from Bhubaneswar to Dhanbad Junction and vice versa.

== Rake reversal or rake share ==
No rake reversal or rake share.

== See also ==
Trains from Bhubaneswar :

- Bhubaneswar–SMVT Bengaluru Humsafar Express
- Rourkela–Bhubaneswar Intercity Express
- Bhubaneswar–New Delhi Duronto Express
- Konark Express
- Bhubaneswar Rajdhani Express

Trains from Dhanbad Junction :

- Howrah–Dhanbad Double Decker Express
- Dhanbad–Alappuzha Express
- Ganga Sutlej Express
- Dhanbad–Ranchi Intercity Express
- Dhanbad–Patna Intercity Express

== Notes ==
a. Runs daily in a week with both directions.
