= Sambalpur–Puri Intercity Express =

Overview
- Service type: Intercity
- Locale: Odisha
- First service: 13 October 2002; 23 years ago
- Current operator: East Coast Railway zone

Route
- Termini: Sambalpur Junction (SBP); Puri (PURI)
- Stops: 14
- Distance travelled: 341 km (212 mi)
- Average journey time: 6h 35m
- Service frequency: Daily (Note: Runs seven days in a week for every direction.)
- Train number: 18303/18304

On-board services
- Classes: AC Chair Car, Second Sitting, General Unreserved
- Seating arrangements: Yes
- Sleeping arrangements: No
- Catering facilities: On-board catering E-catering
- Observation facilities: ICF Utkrisht rakes
- Entertainment facilities: No
- Baggage facilities: No
- Other facilities: Utkrisht Rake

Technical
- Rolling stock: 1
- Track gauge: 1,676 mm (5 ft 6 in)
- Operating speed: 52 km/h (32 mph), including halts

The Sambalpur–Puri Intercity Express is an Intercity train belonging to East Coast Railway zone that runs between Sambalpur Junction and Puri in India. It is currently being operated with 18303/18304 train numbers on a daily basis. It was introduced in 2002 and one of the oldest trains on Cuttack–Sambalpur line.

== Service ==
The 18303/Sambalpur–Puri Intercity Express has an average speed of 52 km/h and covers 341 km in 6h 35m. The 18304/Puri–Sambalpur Intercity Express has an average speed of 52 km/h and covers 341 km in 6h 35m.

== Route and halts ==
The important halts of the train are:

- Sambalpur Junction
- Sambalpur Road
- Jujomura
- Rairakhol
- Bamur
- Boinda
- Jarapada
- Angul
- Talcher road
- Meramandali
- Dhenkanal
- Naraj Marthapur
- Mancheswar
- Bhubaneswar
- Khurda Road Junction
- Puri

== Coach composition ==
The train has standard ICF Utkrisht rakes with a max speed of 110 kmph. The train consists of 16 coaches:

- 2 AC Chair Car
- 2 Second Sitting
- 10 General Unreserved
- 2 Seating cum Luggage Rake

== Traction ==
It is hauled by Visakhapatnam Loco Shed-based WAP-4 or WAP-7 electric locomotive from Sambalpur to Puri end to end

== See also ==
- Sambalpur Junction railway station
- Puri railway station
