= Boinda railway station =

Railway station in Odisha, India

Boinda

General information
- Location: Boinda, Odisha; India
- Coordinates: 20°55′09″N 84°45′03″E
- System: Indian Railways station
- Owner: Ministry of Railways, Indian Railways
- Line: Cuttack–Sambalpur line
- Platforms: 2
- Tracks: 2

Construction
- Structure type: Standard (on ground)
- Parking: No

Other information
- Status: Functioning
- Station code: BONA
- Zone(s): East Coast Railway
- Division(s): Sambalpur
Location
- Location within India Location within Odisha

Boinda railway station is a railway station on the East Coast Railway network in the state of Odisha, India. It serves Boinda town. Its code is BONA. It has two platforms. Passenger, Express and Superfast trains halt at Boinda railway station.

== Major trains ==
- Puri–Durg Express
- Tapaswini Express
- Puri–Ahmedabad Weekly Express
- Rourkela–Gunupur Rajya Rani Express
- Puri–Sainagar Shirdi Express
- Bikaner–Puri Express
- Howrah–Sambalpur Superfast Express
- Sambalpur–Puri Intercity Express
- Rourkela–Bhubaneswar Intercity Express
- Bhubaneswar–Bolangir Intercity Superfast Express
- Hirakud Express

== See also ==
- Angul district
