= Bhubaneswar–Bolangir Intercity Superfast Express =

Train in India

Bhubaneswar–Purunakatak Intercity Superfast Express

Overview
- Service type: Superfast
- First service: 8 February 2006; 20 years ago
- Current operator: East Coast Railway zone

Route
- Termini: Bhubaneswar (BBS); Purunakatak (PUKK)
- Stops: 23
- Distance travelled: 517 km (321 mi)
- Average journey time: 10h 25m
- Service frequency: Daily (Note: Runs seven days in a week for every direction.)
- Train number: 12893/12894

On-board services
- Classes: AC Chair Car, Second Sitting, General Unreserved
- Seating arrangements: Yes
- Sleeping arrangements: No
- Catering facilities: On-board Catering; E-Catering
- Observation facilities: ICF coach
- Entertainment facilities: No
- Baggage facilities: No
- Other facilities: Below the seats

Technical
- Rolling stock: 2 Dedicated Rakes
- Track gauge: 1,676 mm (5 ft 6 in)
- Operating speed: 50 km/h (31 mph), including halts

The Bhubaneswar–Purunakatak Intercity Superfast Express is a Superfast train belonging to East Coast Railway zone that runs between Bhubaneswar and Purunakatak Railway station in India. It hosts 12893/12894 train numbers daily.

== Service ==
This train was introduced on 8 February 2006 between Bhubaneswar and Balangir. It was extended from Balangir to Sonepur on 14 March 2024 and subsequently extended to Purunakatak.

The 12893/Bhubaneswar–Purunakatak Intercity Superfast Express averages speed 50 km/h and covers 517 km in 10h 25m. The 12894/Purunakaatak–Bhubaneswar Superfast Express averages 50 km/h and covers 517 km in 10h 20m.

== Route and halts ==
The important halts of the train are:

- Bhubaneswar
- Mancheswar
- Naraj Marthapur
- Dhenkanal
- Meramandali
- Talcher Road
- Angul
- Boinda
- Bamur
- Rairakhol
- Sambalpur City
- Sambalpur Junction
- Hirakud
- Bargarh Road
- Barpali
- Loisingha
- Balangir
- Bichhupali
- Jhartarbha
- NarasinghGarh
- Sonepur
- Purunapani
- Jharmunda
- Boudh
- Biranarsinghpur
- Purunakatak

== Coach composition ==
The train has standard ICF rakes with max speed of 110 kmph. The train consists of 18 coaches:

- 3 AC Chair Car
- 6 Second Sitting
- 7 General Unreserved
- 2 Seating cum Luggage Rake

== Traction ==
Both trains are hauled by a Visakhapatnam Loco Shed-based WAP-4 or WAP-7 electric locomotive end to end.

== See also ==
- Bhubaneswar railway station
- Purunapani railway station
