= Bhubaneswar–Dhanbad Garib Rath Express =

Indian train

Bhubaneswar–Dhanbad special fare Express

Overview
- Service type: Garib Rath Express
- Locale: Jharkhand, Orissa
- First service: 24 July 2017; 8 years ago
- Successor: 18403/18404 Bhubaneswar–Dhanbad Express
- Current operator: East Coast Railway

Route
- Termini: Bhubaneswar (BBS); Dhanbad (DHN)
- Stops: 10
- Distance travelled: 776 km (482 mi)
- Average journey time: 15h
- Service frequency: Daily (Note: Runs daily for every direction.)
- Train number: 02832/02831

On-board services
- Class: AC 3-tier
- Seating arrangements: Yes
- Sleeping arrangements: Yes
- Auto-rack arrangements: Yes
- Catering facilities: Yes
- Observation facilities: Large windows

Technical
- Rolling stock: 01
- Track gauge: 1,676 mm (5 ft 6 in)
- Operating speed: 51 km/h (32 mph) (average with halts)
- Rake maintenance: Bhubaneswar

The Bhubaneswar–Dhanbad Garib Rath Express is a Garib Rath train belonging to the East Coast Railway zone that runs between and Bhubaneswar and Dhanbad in India. During Covid-19 pandemic the train was discontinued. Post-covid, It is started being operated with 02832/02831 train numbers on daily basis as a normal train. In 2017, after the closure of Dhanbad–Chandrapura line, the train was short terminated/originated from Bokaro Steel City. After opening of Dhanbad–Chandrapura line in 2019, it was again extended up to Dhanbad Junction.

Due to COVID-19 pandemic, the train was cancelled and not yet restored. Instead a tri-weekly special train was introduced with train number 02832/02831 in August 2022 which is running on the route with same time table. Later on the train was made to run daily.

== Service ==
The 12832 Bhubaneswar–Dhanbad Garib Rath Express has an average speed of 52 km/h and covers 776 km in 15 h. The 12831 Dhanbad–Bhubaneswar Garib Rath Express has an average speed of 49 km/h and covers 779 km in 16 h.

== Route and halts ==
The important halts of the train are:

- Dhanbad Junction railway station
- Bokaro Steel City
- Muri Junction
- Ranchi Junction
- Hatia
- Rourkela Junction
- Jharsuguda Junction
- Sambalpur City
- Angul
- Talcher Road
- Dhenkanal
- Cuttack Junction
- Bhubaneswar

== Coach composite ==
The train has standard ICF rakes with max speed of 110 km/h. The train consists of 12 coaches.

== Traction ==
One train comprising 12 wagons is hauled by a Visakhapatnam electric loco shed-based WAP-7 electric locomotive end to end.

== See also ==
- Dhanbad Junction
- Ranchi Junction
- Bhubaneswar
