= Sambalpur Road railway station =

Railway station in Odisha, India

Sambalpur Road

General information
- Location: Sambalpur, Odisha; India
- Coordinates: 21°28′40″N 83°58′34″E
- System: Indian Railways station
- Owner: Ministry of Railways, Indian Railways
- Line: Cuttack–Sambalpur line
- Platforms: 3
- Tracks: 3

Construction
- Structure type: Standard (on ground)
- Parking: No

Other information
- Status: Permanently Closed
- Station code: SBPD
- Zone(s): East Coast Railway
- Division(s): Sambalpur
Location
- Location within India Location within Odisha

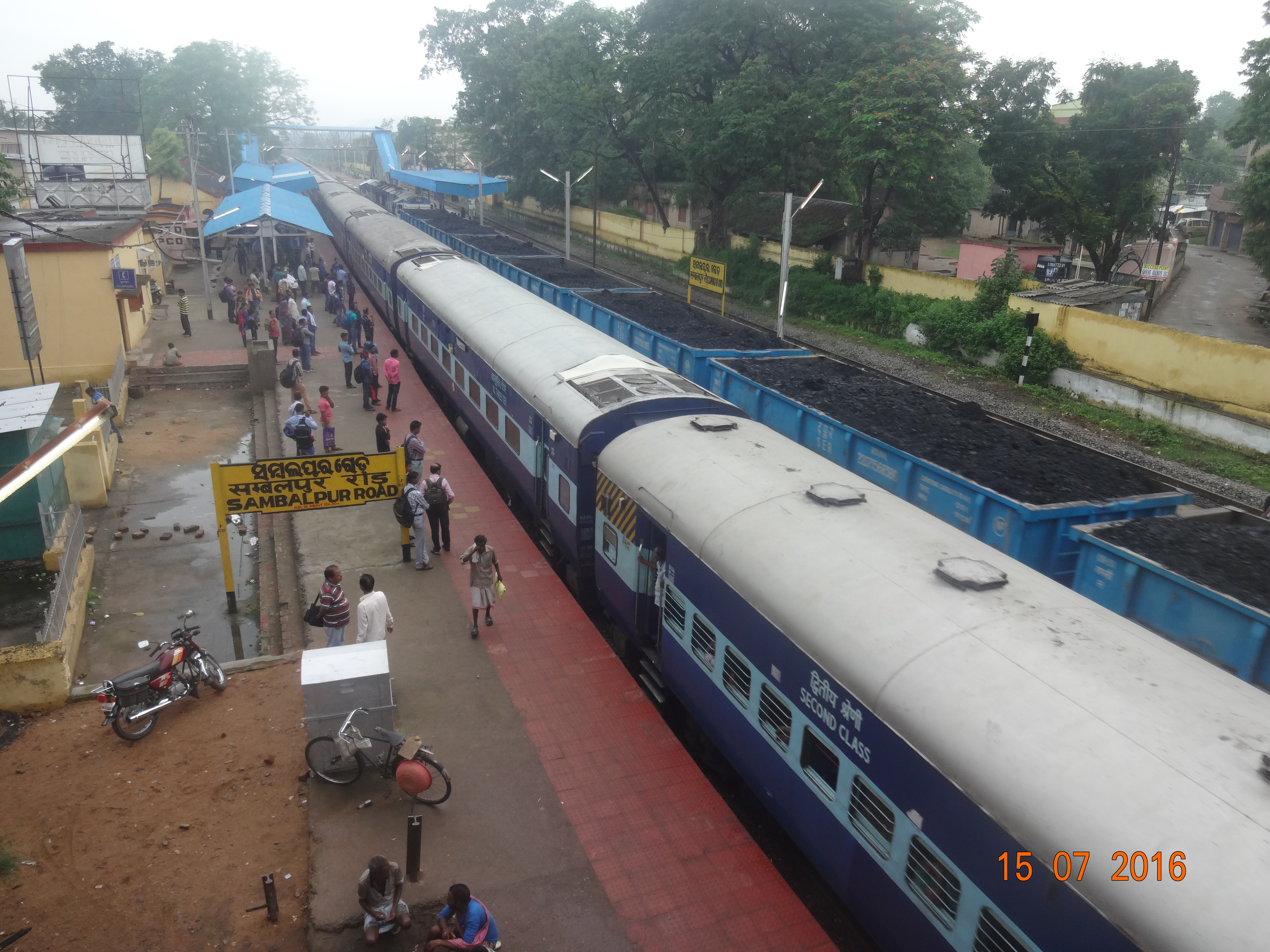
Picture of the Sambalpur Road railway station

Sambalpur Road railway station was a railway station on the East Coast Railway network in the state of Odisha, India. It was located right next to the renowned Gangadhar Meher University. It served Sambalpur city. Its code is SBPD. It used to have three platforms. Passenger, Express and Superfast trains halted at Sambalpur Road railway station.

== Major trains ==
- Puri–Durg Express
- Puri–Ahmedabad Weekly Express
- Dhanbad–Alappuzha Express
- Puri Jodhpur Express
- Tapaswini Express
- Lokmanya Tilak Terminus–Puri Superfast Express (via Titlagarh)
- Sambalpur–Puri Intercity Express
- Ispat Express
- Samaleshwari Express
- Hirakud Express
- Bhubaneswar–Bolangir Intercity Superfast Express

== See also ==
- Sambalpur district
