= Puri–Surat Express =

Train in India

Overview
- Service type: Superfast
- First service: 15 December 2009; 15 years ago
- Current operator(s): East Coast Railway

Route
- Termini: Puri (PURI); Surat (ST)
- Stops: 15
- Distance travelled: 1,757 km (1,092 mi)
- Average journey time: 30 hours 35 minutes
- Service frequency: Weekly
- Train number(s): 22827 / 22828

On-board services
- Class(es): AC 2 Tier, AC 3 Tier, Sleeper Class, General Unreserved.
- Seating arrangements: Yes
- Sleeping arrangements: Yes
- Catering facilities: On-board catering E-catering
- Observation facilities: Large windows
- Baggage facilities: Available

Technical
- Rolling stock: LHB coach
- Track gauge: 1,676 mm (5 ft 6 in)
- Operating speed: 57 km/h (35 mph) Average with halts

The 22827 / 22828 Puri–Surat Express is a Superfast train running between Puri of Odisha and Surat of Gujarat.

It operates as train number 22827 from Puri to Surat and as train number 22828 in the reverse direction serving the states of Gujarat, Maharashtra, Chhattisgarh and Odisha.

== Coach composition ==
The train consists of 22 coaches:

- 1 AC II Tier
- 4 AC III Tier
- 10 Sleeper Class
- 5 General Unreserved
- 2 End-on Generator

== Services ==
22827 Puri–Surat Express covers the distance of 1757 km in 31 hours 35 mins (56 km/h) and in 31 hours 45 mins as 22828 Surat–Puri Express (55 km/h).

As the average speed of the train is 55 km/h (35 mph), as per Indian Railway rules, its fare includes a Superfast surcharge.

== Route and halts ==
The important halts of the train are;

- Puri
- Khurda Road Junction
- Bhubaneswar
- Dhenkanal
- Talcher Road
- Angul
- Sambalpur Junction
- Bargarh Road
- Balangir
- Titlagarh Junction
- Kantabanji
- Raipur Junction
- Durg Junction
- Gondia Junction
- Nagpur Junction
- Bhusaval Junction
- Jalgaon Junction
- Surat.

== Rake sharing ==
The train shares its rake with 18419/18420 Puri–Jaynagar Express.

== Schedule ==
| Train number | Station code | Departure station | Departure time | Departure day | Arrival station | Arrival time | Arrival day |
|---|---|---|---|---|---|---|---|
| 22827 | PURI | Puri | 19:45 PM | Sunday | Surat | 03:20 AM | Tuesday |
| 22828 | ST | Surat | 08:30 AM | Tuesday | Puri | 16:15 PM | Wednesday |

== Traction ==
Both trains are hauled by a Vadodara Loco Shed or Visakhapatnam Loco Shed-based WAP-7 electric locomotive from end to end.

== See also ==
- Indian Railways – Travel Coach types and their seating / berths
