= Jharsuguda Road railway station =

Railway station in Odisha, India

Jharsuguda Road

General information
- Location: Jharsuguda, Odisha; India
- Coordinates: 21°50′46″N 84°00′42″E
- System: Indian Railway Station
- Owner: Ministry of Railways, Indian Railways
- Line: Jharsuguda–Vizianagaram line
- Platforms: 2
- Tracks: 4

Construction
- Structure type: Standard (On Ground)
- Parking: No

Other information
- Status: Functioning
- Station code: JSGR
- Zone(s): East Coast Railway
- Division(s): Sambalpur
Location
- Location within India Location within Odisha

Jharsuguda Road railway station is a railway station in the East Coast Railway zone in the state of Odisha, India. Its code is JSGR. It serves Jharsuguda. It has two platforms. It is a by-pass station, connecting Sambalpur & Bilaspur by skipping Jharsuguda Junction. Passenger, Express and Superfast trains halt at Jharsuguda Road railway station.

== Major Trains ==
- Hirakud Express
- Indore–Puri Humsafar Express
- Valsad–Puri Superfast Express
- Bikaner–Puri Express
- Puri–Jodhpur Express
- Lokmanya Tilak Terminus–Puri Superfast Express
- Lokmanya Tilak Terminus–Bhubaneswar Superfast Express
- Rourkela - Puri Passenger
- Bilaspur - Titlagarh Passenger
- Jharsuguda - Sambalpur MEMU

== See also ==
- Jharsuguda District
