= Rairakhol railway station =

Railway station in Odisha, India

Rairakhol

General information
- Location: Rairakhol, Odisha; India
- Coordinates: 21°02′46″N 84°20′00″E
- System: Indian Railways station
- Owner: Ministry of Railways, Indian Railways
- Line: Cuttack–Sambalpur line
- Platforms: 3
- Tracks: 4

Construction
- Structure type: Standard (on ground)
- Parking: Yes

Other information
- Status: Functioning
- Station code: RAIR
- Zone(s): East Coast Railway
- Division(s): Sambalpur

History
- Opened: 1998

Services
Preceding station	Indian Railways	Following station
Charmal towards ?	East Coast Railway zone Cuttack–Sambalpur line	Bamur towards ?
Location
- Location within India Location within Odisha

Rairakhol railway station is a railway station on the East Coast Railway network in the state of Odisha, India. It serves Redhakhol town. Its station code is RAIR. It lies on the Cuttack-Sambalpur line and a total of 36 trains halt at this station.

== Major trains ==
- Puri–Ahmedabad Weekly Express
- Puri–Durg Express
- Rourkela–Gunupur Rajya Rani Express
- Tapaswini Express
- Puri–Ajmer Express
- Puri–Jodhpur Express
- Bikaner–Puri Express
- Howrah–Sambalpur Superfast Express
- Sambalpur–Puri Intercity Express
- Rourkela–Bhubaneswar Intercity Express
- Bhubaneswar–Bolangir Intercity Superfast Express
- Hirakud Express
- Bhubaneswar–Anand Vihar Weekly Superfast Express

== See also ==
- Sambalpur district
