= Barpali railway station =

Railway station in Odisha, India

Barpali

General information
- Location: Barpali, Odisha; India
- Coordinates: 21°11′01″N 83°35′43″E
- System: Indian Railways station
- Owner: Ministry of Railways, Indian Railways
- Line: Jharsuguda–Vizianagaram line
- Platforms: 2
- Tracks: 2

Construction
- Structure type: Standard (on ground)
- Parking: No

Other information
- Status: Functioning
- Station code: BRPL
- Zone(s): East Coast Railway
- Division(s): Sambalpur
Location
- Location within India Location within Odisha

Barpali railway station is a railway station on the East Coast Railway network in the state of Odisha, India. It serves Barpali town. Its code is BRPL. It has two platforms. Passenger, Express and Superfast trains halt at Barpali railway station.

== Major trains ==
- Dhanbad–Alappuzha Express
- Sambalpur–Rayagada Intercity Express
- Tapaswini Express
- Samaleshwari Express
- Puri–Durg Express
- Ispat Express
- Rourkela–Jagdalpur Express
- Bhubaneswar–Bolangir Intercity Superfast Express

== See also ==
- Bargarh district
