= Bhubaneswar–Anand Vihar Weekly Superfast Express =

Train in India

Overview
- Service type: Superfast
- First service: 9 July 2013; 12 years ago
- Current operator: East Coast Railway zone

Route
- Termini: Bhubaneswar (BBS); Anand Vihar Terminal (ANVT)
- Stops: 16
- Distance travelled: 1,885 km (1,171 mi)
- Average journey time: 32h 5m
- Service frequency: Weekly (Note: Runs one day in a week for every direction.)
- Train number: 22805/22806

On-board services
- Classes: AC 2 tier, AC 3 tier, Sleeper class, General Unreserved
- Seating arrangements: No
- Sleeping arrangements: Yes
- Catering facilities: On-board catering E-catering
- Observation facilities: LHB coach
- Entertainment facilities: No
- Baggage facilities: No
- Other facilities: Below the seats

Technical
- Rolling stock: 2
- Track gauge: 1,676 mm (5 ft 6 in)
- Operating speed: 59 km/h (37 mph), including halts

The Bhubaneswar–Anand Vihar Weekly Superfast Express is a Superfast train belonging to East Coast Railway zone that runs between Bhubaneswar and Anand Vihar Terminal in India. It is currently being operated with 22805/22806 train numbers on a weekly basis.

== Service ==
The 22805/Bhubaneswar–Anand Vihar Weekly SF Express has an average speed of 59 km/h and covers 1885 km in 32h 5m. The 22806/Anand Vihar Terminal–Bhubaneswar Weekly SF Express has an average speed of 57 km/h and covers 1885 km in 33h.

== Routes and halts ==
The important halts of the train are:

- Bhubaneswar
- Dhenkanal
- Angul
- Rairakhol
- Sambalpur City
- Jharsuguda Junction
- Rourkela Junction
- Chakradharpur
- Muri Junction
- Bokaro Steel City
- Chandrapura Junction railway station
- Netaji Subhash Chandra Bose Junction Gomoh
- Koderma Junction railway station
- Gaya Junction
- Pandit Deen Dayal Upadhyaya Junction railway station
- Prayagraj Junction railway station
- Kanpur Central
- Anand Vihar Terminal

== Coach composition ==
The train has Hybrid-LHB rakes with a max speed of 110 kmph. The train consists of 17 coaches :

- 1 First AC
- 2 AC II Tier
- 4 AC III Tier
- 8 Sleeper coaches
- 1 Pantry car
- 8 General Unreserved
- 2 Seating cum Luggage Rake

== Traction ==
Both trains are hauled by a Vadodara-based WAP-7 electric locomotive from Bhubaneswar to Anand Vihar Terminal.

== Rake sharing ==
The train shares its rake with 12281/12282 Bhubaneswar–New Delhi Duronto Express.

== See also ==
- Bhubaneswar–New Delhi Duronto Express
- Odisha Sampark Kranti Express
