= Handapa railway station =

Railway station in Odisha

Handapa

General information
- Location: Sambalpur-Cuttack Road, Baisana, Angul district, Odisha; India
- Coordinates: 20°56′36″N 84°41′05″E
- Elevation: 258 metres (846 ft)
- System: Indian Railways station
- Owner: Indian Railways
- Line: Cuttack–Sambalpur line
- Platforms: 1
- Tracks: 2

Construction
- Structure type: Standard (on ground)
- Parking: Yes

Other information
- Status: Functioning
- Station code: HNPA
- Zone(s): East Coast Railway
- Division(s): Sambalpur

History
- Opened: 1998

Services
| Preceding station | Indian Railways | Following station |
|---|---|---|
| Saragipali towards ? | East Coast Railway zone Cuttack–Sambalpur line | Boinda towards ? |
Location
- Location within India Location within Odisha

Handapa railway station is a railway station on Cuttack–Sambalpur line under the Sambalpur railway division of the East Coast Railway zone. The railway station is situated beside Sambalpur-Cuttack Road at Baisana in Angul district of the Indian state of Odisha.
