= Kerejanga railway station =

Railway station in Odisha, India

Kerejanga

General information
- Location: Badakerjang, Angul district, Odisha; India
- Coordinates: 20°51′21″N 84°58′36″E
- Elevation: 164 metres (538 ft)
- System: Indian Railways station
- Owner: Indian Railways
- Line: Cuttack–Sambalpur line
- Platforms: 2
- Tracks: 2

Construction
- Structure type: Standard (on ground)
- Parking: Yes

Other information
- Status: Functioning
- Station code: KPJG
- Zone(s): East Coast Railway
- Division(s): Sambalpur

History
- Opened: 1998

Services
Preceding station	Indian Railways	Following station
Jarapada towards ?	East Coast Railway zone Cuttack–Sambalpur line	Angul towards ?
Location
- Location within India Location within Odisha

Kerejanga railway station is a railway station on Cuttack–Sambalpur line under the Sambalpur railway division of the East Coast Railway zone. The railway station is situated at Badakerjang in Angul district of the Indian state of Odisha.
