= Jujumura railway station =

Railway station in Odisha

Jujumura

General information
- Location: Jujumura, Sambalpur district, Odisha; India
- Coordinates: 21°14′22″N 84°08′05″E
- Elevation: 222 metres (728 ft)
- System: Indian Railways station
- Owner: Indian Railways
- Line: Cuttack–Sambalpur line
- Platforms: 1
- Tracks: 2

Construction
- Structure type: Standard (on ground)
- Parking: Yes

Other information
- Status: Functioning
- Station code: JUJA
- Zone(s): East Coast Railway
- Division(s): Sambalpur

History
- Opened: 1998

Services
Preceding station	Indian Railways	Following station
Hatibari towards ?	East Coast Railway zone Cuttack–Sambalpur line	Charmal towards ?
Location
- Location within India Location within Odisha

Jujumura railway station is a railway station on Cuttack–Sambalpur line under the Sambalpur railway division of the East Coast Railway zone. The railway station is situated at Jujumura in Sambalpur district of the Indian state of Odisha.
