= Charmal railway station =

Railway station in Odisha, India

Charmal

General information
- Location: Erendibahal, Sambalpur district, Odisha; India
- Coordinates: 21°05′43″N 84°12′16″E
- Elevation: 160 metres (520 ft)
- System: Indian Railways station
- Owner: Indian Railways
- Line: Cuttack–Sambalpur line
- Platforms: 1
- Tracks: 2

Construction
- Structure type: Standard (on ground)
- Parking: Yes

Other information
- Status: Functioning
- Station code: CHAR
- Zone(s): East Coast Railway
- Division(s): Sambalpur

History
- Opened: 1998

Services
| Preceding station | Indian Railways | Following station |
|---|---|---|
| Jujumura towards ? | East Coast Railway zone Cuttack–Sambalpur line | Rairakhol towards ? |
Location
- Location within India Location within Odisha

Charmal railway station is a railway station on Cuttack–Sambalpur line under the Sambalpur railway division of the East Coast Railway zone. The railway station is situated at Erendibahal in Sambalpur district of the Indian state of Odisha.
