= Bamur railway station =

Railway station in Odisha, India

Bamur

General information
- Location: Bamur, Odisha; India
- Coordinates: 21°00′23″N 84°28′39″E
- System: Indian Railway Station
- Owner: Ministry of Railways, Indian Railways
- Line: Cuttack–Sambalpur line
- Platforms: 3
- Tracks: 3

Construction
- Structure type: Standard (On Ground)
- Parking: No

Other information
- Status: Functioning
- Station code: BAMR
- Zone(s): East Coast Railway
- Division(s): Sambalpur

Services
Preceding station	Indian Railways	Following station
Rairakhol towards ?	East Coast Railway zone Cuttack–Sambalpur line	Saragipali towards ?
Location
- Location within India Location within Odisha

Bamur railway station is a railway station on the East Coast Railway network in the state of Odisha, India. It serves Bamur village. Its code is BAMR. It has three platforms. Passenger, Express and Superfast trains halt at Bamur railway station.

== Major trains ==
- Sambalpur - Puri Intercity Express
- Bhubaneswar - Bolangir Intercity Superfast Express

== See also ==
- Angul district
