= Rourkela–Gunupur Rajya Rani Express =

Train in India

Rajya Rani Express
Overview
- Service type: Rajya Rani Express
- First service: 11 November 2011; 14 years ago
- Current operator: South Eastern Railways

Route
- Termini: Rourkela (ROU); Gunupur (GNPR)
- Stops: 25
- Distance travelled: 799 km (496 mi)
- Average journey time: 17 hours 12 mins
- Service frequency: Daily
- Train number: 18117 / 18118

On-board services
- Classes: AC 2 Tier, AC 3 Tier, Sleeper class, General Unreserved
- Seating arrangements: Yes
- Sleeping arrangements: Yes
- Catering facilities: E-catering
- Other facilities: Below the seats

Technical
- Rolling stock: LHB coach
- Track gauge: 1,676 mm (5 ft 6 in)
- Operating speed: 49 km/h (30 mph) average including halts
Route map
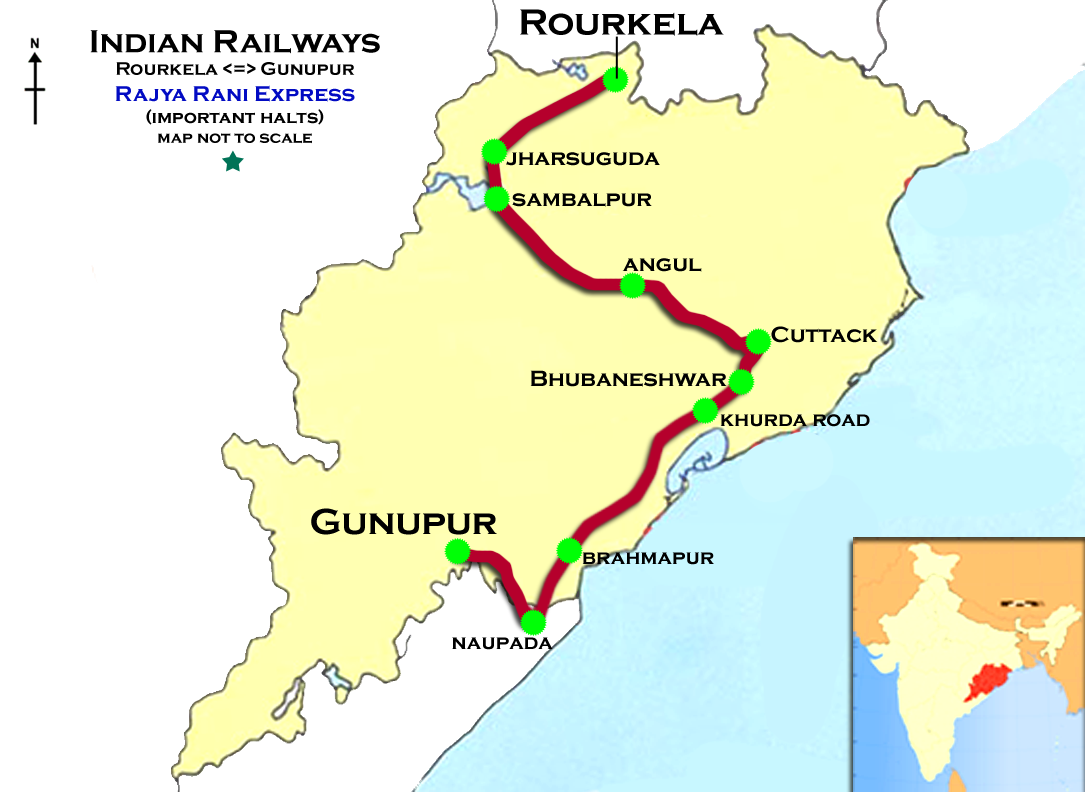

The 18117 / 18118 Rajya Rani Express is an Express train belonging to Indian Railways South Eastern Railway zone that runs between Rourkela Junction and Gunupur in India. This train is a part of Rajya Rani Express series from Odisha state.

It operates as train number 18117 from Rourkela Junction to Gunupur and as train number 18118 in the reverse direction, serving the states of Odisha.

== Coaches ==
The 18117 / 18 Rajya Rani Express has one AC 2 Tier, two AC 3 Tier, 6 Sleeper class, 6 general unreserved & two SLR (seating with luggage rake) coaches . It does not carry a pantry car.

As is customary with most train services in India, coach composition may be amended at the discretion of Indian Railways depending on demand.

== Service ==
The 18117 Rourkela Junction–Gunupur Rajya Rani Express covers the distance of 799 km (496 mi) in 15 hours 10 mins (53 km/h) and in 19 hours 15 mins as the 18118 Gunupur–Rourkela Junction Rajya Rani Express (41 km/h).

As the average speed of the train is lower than 55 km/h (34 mph), as per railway rules, its fare doesn't include a Superfast surcharge.

== Route and halts ==
The 18117 / 18118 Rajya Rani Express runs from Rourkela Junction via Bagdehi, Jharsuguda Junction, Sambalpur City, Rairakhol, Angul, Talcher Road, Cuttack Junction, Bhubaneswar, Khurda Road Junction, Nirakarpur, Balugaon, Brahmapur, Palasa, Naupada to Gunupur.

== Traction ==
earlier was WDP-4B. It is either pulled by a Bonda Munda based WAP-7 or a TATA based WAP-7 entirely from Rourkela to Gunupur.
