= Saragipali railway station =

Railway station in Odisha

Saragipalii

General information
- Location: Gatikrishnapur, Angul district, Odisha; India
- Coordinates: 20°59′03″N 84°33′55″E
- Elevation: 197 metres (646 ft)
- System: Indian Railways station
- Owner: Indian Railways
- Line: Cuttack–Sambalpur line
- Platforms: 1
- Tracks: 2

Construction
- Structure type: Standard (on ground)
- Parking: Yes

Other information
- Status: Functioning
- Station code: SRGP
- Zone(s): East Coast Railway
- Division(s): Sambalpur

History
- Opened: 1998

Services
Preceding station	Indian Railways	Following station
Bamur towards ?	East Coast Railway zone Cuttack–Sambalpur line	Handapa towards ?
Location
- Location within India Location within Odisha

Saragipalii railway station is a railway station on Cuttack–Sambalpur line under the Sambalpur railway division of the East Coast Railway zone. The railway station is situated at Gatikrishnapur in Angul district of the Indian state of Odisha.
