= Jarapada railway station =

Railway station in Odisha, India

Jarapada

General information
- Location: Sauria, Jarapada, Angul district, Odisha; India
- Coordinates: 20°53′06″N 84°53′15″E
- Elevation: 208 metres (682 ft)
- System: Indian Railways station
- Owner: Indian Railways
- Line: Cuttack–Sambalpur line
- Platforms: 2
- Tracks: 2

Construction
- Structure type: Standard (on ground)
- Parking: Yes

Other information
- Status: Functioning
- Station code: JRPD
- Zone(s): East Coast Railway
- Division(s): Sambalpur

History
- Opened: 1998

Services
Preceding station	Indian Railways	Following station
Boinda towards ?	East Coast Railway zone Cuttack–Sambalpur line	Kerejanga towards ?
Location
- Location within India Location within Odisha

Jarapada railway station is a railway station on Cuttack–Sambalpur line under the Sambalpur railway division of the East Coast Railway zone. The railway station is situated at Sauria, Jarapada in Angul district of the Indian state of Odisha.

== Ongoing projects ==
- Talcher Road–Sambalpur rail line doubling
- Capacity enhancement for freight movement in the Angul–Talcher industrial belt
