= Naraj Marthapur railway station =

Railway station in Odisha, India

Naraj Marthapur

General information
- Location: Naraj Marthapur, Odisha; India
- Coordinates: 20°27′34″N 85°46′49″E
- System: Indian Railways station
- Owner: Ministry of Railways, Indian Railways
- Line: Cuttack–Sambalpur line
- Platforms: 3
- Tracks: 3

Construction
- Structure type: Standard (on ground)
- Parking: No

Other information
- Status: Functioning
- Station code: NQR
- Zone(s): East Coast Railway
- Division(s): Khurda Road
Location
- Location within India Location within Odisha

Naraj Marthapur railway station is a railway station on the East Coast Railway network in the state of Odisha, India. It serves Naraj Marthapur village. Its code is NQR. It has three platforms. Passenger, MEMU, Express and Superfast trains halt at Naraj Marthapur railway station.

== Major trains ==
- Puri–Ajmer Express
- Bhubaneswar–Bolangir Intercity Superfast Express
- Hirakud Express
- Sambalpur–Puri Intercity Express
- Rourkela–Bhubaneswar Intercity Express

== See also ==
- Cuttack district
