= Budhapank railway station =

Railway station in Odisha, India

Budhapank

General information
- Location: Tentulihata, Angul district, Odisha; India
- Coordinates: 20°51′11″N 85°15′21″E
- Elevation: 79 metres (259 ft)
- System: Indian Railways station
- Owner: Indian Railways
- Line: Cuttack–Sambalpur line
- Platforms: 3
- Tracks: 2

Construction
- Structure type: Standard (on ground)
- Parking: Yes

Other information
- Status: Functioning
- Station code: BDPK
- Zone(s): East Coast Railway
- Division(s): Khurda Road

History
- Opened: 1998

Services
Preceding station	Indian Railways	Following station
Talcher road towards ?	East Coast Railway zone Cuttack–Sambalpur line	Meramandali towards ?
Location
- Location within India Location within Odisha

Budhapank railway station is a railway station on Cuttack–Sambalpur line under the Khurda Road railway division of the East Coast Railway zone. The railway station is situated at Tentulihata in Angul district of the Indian state of Odisha.
