= Dandi Mal railway station =

Railway station in Odisha, India

Dandi Mal

General information
- Location: Sadasivapur, Kankadobala, Dhenkanal district, Odisha; India
- Coordinates: 20°42′55″N 85°32′03″E
- Elevation: 70 metres (230 ft)
- System: Indian Railways station
- Owner: Indian Railways
- Line: Cuttack–Sambalpur line
- Platforms: 2
- Tracks: 2

Construction
- Structure type: Standard (on ground)
- Parking: Yes

Other information
- Status: Functioning
- Station code: DNDL
- Zone(s): East Coast Railway
- Division(s): Khurda Road

History
- Opened: 1998

Services
Preceding station	Indian Railways	Following station
Sadashibapur towards ?	East Coast Railway zone Cuttack–Sambalpur line	Dhenkanal towards ?
Location
- Location within India Location within Odisha

Dandi Mal railway station is a railway station on Cuttack–Sambalpur line under the Khurda Road railway division of the East Coast Railway zone. The railway station is situated at Sadasivapur, Kankadobala in Dhenkanal district of the Indian state of Odisha.
