= Sarpeswar railway station =

Railway station in Odisha, India

Sarpeswar

General information
- Location: Nuashasan, Dhurusia, Cuttack district, Odisha; India
- Coordinates: 20°28′58″N 85°44′42″E
- Elevation: 44 metres (144 ft)
- System: Indian Railways station
- Owner: Indian Railways
- Line: Cuttack–Sambalpur line
- Platforms: 2
- Tracks: 2

Construction
- Structure type: Standard (on ground)
- Parking: No

Other information
- Status: Functioning
- Station code: SPSR
- Zone(s): East Coast Railway
- Division(s): Khurda Road

History
- Opened: 1998

Services
Preceding station	Indian Railways	Following station
Ghantikhal Nidhipur towards ?	East Coast Railway zone Cuttack–Sambalpur line	Naraj Marthapur towards ?
Location
- Location within India Location within Odisha

Sarpeswar railway station is a halt railway station on Cuttack–Sambalpur line under the Khurda Road railway division of the East Coast Railway zone. The railway station is situated at Nuashasan, Dhurusia in Cuttack district of the Indian state of Odisha.
