= Jujumura =

Jujumura is a block under Sambalpur district of Odisha. This Block started functioning w.e.f. 03.10.1961. The Geographical area of this block is 660 sq kms having a total population of 83,072 as per 2011 Census. Out of which 12332 are Scheduled Castes (SC) and 41608 are Scheduled Tribes (ST) and 29132 are others people. The percentage of SC and ST population comes to 14.84 and 50.09 respectively. There are 18 Nos. of GPs having 126 Nos. of Revenue villages out of which 6 nos. of villages are uninhabitated. The Block is coming under three Police Stations namely Jujomura, Sadar and Sason Police Station. The Block is coming under the 18-Rairakhol Assembly Constituency and 03-Sambalpur Parliamentary Constituency.

== Transport ==
Jujumura railway station is situated on Cuttack–Sambalpur line under the Sambalpur railway division of the East Coast Railway zone.

Jujumura ( ଯୁଯୁମୁରା ) Jujumura
- Block (Panchayat Samiti)
- ଯୁଯୁମୁରା
- Interactive map of Jujumura ( ଯୁଯୁମୁରା )
- Coordinates: 21°18′22″N 84°5′7″E
- Country: India
- State: Odisha
- District: Sambalpur
- Established: 03.10.1961

Government
  - Type: Panchayati raj (India)
  - Body: Panchayat samiti

Population (2011)
  - Total: 83,072

Languages
  - Official: Odia
  - Other spoken: Hindi, Sambalpuri
- Time zone: UTC+5:30 (IST)
- PIN: 768105
- Area code: 768105
