= Hindol Road railway station =

Railway station in Odisha, India

Hindol Road

General information
- Location: Paneilo, Dhenkanal district, Odisha; India
- Coordinates: 20°46′07″N 85°25′28″E
- Elevation: 63 metres (207 ft)
- System: Indian Railways station
- Owner: Indian Railways
- Line: Cuttack–Sambalpur line
- Platforms: 3
- Tracks: 2

Construction
- Structure type: Standard (on ground)
- Parking: Yes

Other information
- Status: Functioning
- Station code: HND
- Zone(s): East Coast Railway
- Division(s): Khurda Road

History
- Opened: 1998

Services
| Preceding station | Indian Railways | Following station |
|---|---|---|
| Nayabhagirathipur towards ? | East Coast Railway zone Cuttack–Sambalpur line | Mahadia towards ? |
Location
- Location within India Location within Odisha

Hindol Road railway station is a railway station on Cuttack–Sambalpur line under the Khurda Road railway division of the East Coast Railway zone. The railway station is situated at Paneilo in Dhenkanal district of the Indian state of Odisha.
