= Howrah–Sambalpur Superfast Express =

Train in India

Overview
- Service type: Express
- First service: 6 December 2010; 15 years ago
- Current operator: East Coast Railway zone

Route
- Termini: Howrah Junction (HWH); Sambalpur Junction (SBP)
- Stops: 9
- Distance travelled: 659 km (409 mi)
- Average journey time: 10h 45m
- Service frequency: Weekly (Note: Runs one day in a week for every direction.)
- Train number: 22803/22804

On-board services
- Classes: AC II Tier, AC III Tier, Sleeper class, General Unreserved
- Seating arrangements: No
- Sleeping arrangements: Yes
- Catering facilities: E-catering
- Observation facilities: ICF coach
- Entertainment facilities: No
- Baggage facilities: No
- Other facilities: Below the seats

Technical
- Rolling stock: 2
- Track gauge: 1,676 mm (5 ft 6 in)
- Operating speed: 61 km/h (38 mph), including halts

The Howrah–Sambalpur Superfast Express is an Express train belonging to East Coast Railway zone that runs between Howrah Junction and Sambalpur Junction in India. It is currently being operated with 22803/22804 train numbers on a weekly basis.

== Service ==
The 22803/Howrah–Sambalpur Superfast Express has an average speed of 61 km/h and covers 659 km in 10h 45m. 22804/Sambalpur–Howrah Superfast Express has an average speed of 60 km/h and covers 659 km in 11h.

== Route and halts ==
The important halts of the train are:

- Howrah Junction
- Kharagpur Junction
- Balasore
- Bhadrak
- Dhenkanal
- Angul
- Sambalpur Junction

== Coach composition ==
The train has standard LCF rakes with a maximum speed of 110 km/h. The train consists of 18 coaches:

- 1 AC II Tier
- 2 AC III Tier
- 6 Sleeper coaches
- 7 General
- 2 Seating cum Luggage Rake

== Traction ==
Both trains are hauled by a Santragachi Loco Shed-based WAP-4 or WAP-7 electric locomotive from Sambalpur to Howrah and vice versa.

== Rake sharing ==
Train shares its rake with 18311/18312 Sambalpur–Varanasi Express.

== See also ==
- Howrah Junction railway station
- Sambalpur Junction railway station
- Sambalpur–Varanasi Express
