= Mahadia railway station =

Railway station in Odisha, India

Mahadia

General information
- Location: Barabahali, Dhenkanal district, Odisha; India
- Coordinates: 20°45′03″N 85°28′33″E
- Elevation: 63 metres (207 ft)
- System: Indian Railways station
- Owner: Indian Railways
- Line: Cuttack–Sambalpur line
- Platforms: 2
- Tracks: 2

Construction
- Structure type: Standard (on ground)
- Parking: Yes

Other information
- Status: Functioning
- Station code: MHDB
- Zone(s): East Coast Railway
- Division(s): Khurda Road

History
- Opened: 1998; 28 years ago

Services
Preceding station	Indian Railways	Following station
Hindol Road towards ?	East Coast Railway zone Cuttack–Sambalpur line	Sadashibapur towards ?
Location
- Location within India Location within Odisha

Mahadia railway station is a halt railway station on Cuttack–Sambalpur line under the Khurda Road railway division of the East Coast Railway zone. The railway station is situated at Barabahali in Dhenkanal district of the Indian state of Odisha.
