= Ghantikhal Nidhipur railway station =

Railway station in Odisha, India

Ghantikhal Nidhipur

General information
- Location: Ghantikhala, Cuttack district, Odisha; India
- Coordinates: 20°30′39″N 85°44′10″E
- Elevation: 37 metres (121 ft)
- System: Indian Railways station
- Owner: Indian Railways
- Line: Cuttack–Sambalpur line
- Platforms: 3
- Tracks: 2

Construction
- Structure type: Standard (on ground)
- Parking: Yes

Other information
- Status: Functioning
- Station code: GHNH
- Zone(s): East Coast Railway
- Division(s): Khurda Road

History
- Opened: 1998

Services
Preceding station	Indian Railways	Following station
Radhakishorepur towards ?	East Coast Railway zone Cuttack–Sambalpur line	Sarpeswar towards ?
Location
- Location within India Location within Odisha

Ghantikhal Nidhipur railway station is a railway station on Cuttack–Sambalpur line under the Khurda Road railway division of the East Coast Railway zone. The railway station is situated at Ghantikhala in Cuttack district of the Indian state of Odisha.
