= Hirakud railway station =

Railway station in Odisha, India

Hirakud

General information
- Location: Hirakud, Odisha; India
- Coordinates: 21°28′47″N 83°54′19″E
- System: Indian Railways station
- Owner: Ministry of Railways, Indian Railways
- Line: Jharsuguda–Vizianagaram line
- Platforms: 3
- Tracks: 3

Construction
- Structure type: Standard (on ground)
- Parking: No

Other information
- Status: Functioning
- Station code: HKG
- Zone(s): East Coast Railway
- Division(s): Sambalpur
Location
- Location within India Location within Odisha

Hirakud railway station is a railway station on the East Coast Railway network in the state of Odisha, India. It serves Hirakud town. Its code is HKG. It has three platforms. Passenger, Express and Superfast trains halt at Hirakud railway station.

== Major trains ==
- Puri–Ahmedabad Weekly Express
- Sambalpur–Rayagada Intercity Express
- Ispat Express
- Samaleshwari Express
- Bhubaneswar–Bolangir Intercity Superfast Express

== See also ==
- Sambalpur district
