= Radhakishorepur railway station =

Railway station in Odisha, India

Radhakishorepur

General information
- Location: Gurudijhatia Road, Radhadamodarpur, Cuttack district, Odisha; India
- Coordinates: 20°33′36″N 85°45′16″E
- Elevation: 50 metres (160 ft)
- System: Indian Railways station
- Owner: Indian Railways
- Line: Cuttack–Sambalpur line
- Platforms: 2
- Tracks: 2

Construction
- Structure type: Standard (on ground)
- Parking: No

Other information
- Status: Functioning
- Station code: RQP
- Zone(s): East Coast Railway
- Division(s): Khurda Road

History
- Opened: 1998

Services
Preceding station	Indian Railways	Following station
Rajathgarh Junction towards ?	East Coast Railway zone Cuttack–Sambalpur line	Ghantikhal Nidhipur towards ?
Location
- Location within India Location within Odisha

Radhakishorepur railway station is a railway station on Cuttack–Sambalpur line under the Khurda Road railway division of the East Coast Railway zone. The railway station is situated beside Gurudijhatia Road at Radhadamodarpur in Cuttack district of the Indian state of Odisha.
