= Puri–Sainagar Shirdi Express =

Puri Sainagar Shirdi SF Express
Overview
- Service type: Express
- First service: 16 August 2013; 12 years ago
- Current operator: East Coast Railway zone

Route
- Termini: Puri; Sainagar Shirdi
- Stops: 24
- Distance travelled: 1,689 km (1,049 mi)
- Average journey time: 29 hours 30 mins
- Service frequency: Leaves Puri Every Friday & Leaves Shirdi Every Sunday
- Train number: 20857 / 20858

On-board services
- Classes: AC 1st, AC 2 Tier, AC 3 Tier, Sleeper Class & General Unreserved
- Seating arrangements: Yes
- Sleeping arrangements: Yes
- Catering facilities: Pantry car is attached

Technical
- Rolling stock: 3 LHB coach
- Track gauge: 1,676 mm (5 ft 6 in)
- Operating speed: 55 km/h (34 mph)

20857/58 Puri–Sainagar Shirdi SF Express is a Superfast train belonging to Indian Railways East Coast Railway zone that run between Puri and Sainagar Shirdi in India.

== Service ==
Earlier this train was operated as Express havin train number- 18407/18408. Now it operates as train number 20857 from Puri to Sainagar Shirdi and as train number 20858 in the reverse direction, serving the states of Maharashtra, Chhattisgarh & Odisha . The train covers the distance of 1,689 km (1,049 mi) in 29 hours 30 mins approximately at a speed of (55 km/h (34 mph)).

== Coaches ==
The 20857 / 20858 Puri–Sainagar Shirdi SF Express has One AC-1 Tier, Two AC 2-Tier, Seven AC 3-Tier, Six Sleeper Class, Four General Unreserved & Two SLR (seating with luggage rake) coaches . It carries a pantry car.

As with most train services in India, coach composition may be amended at the discretion of Indian Railways depending on demand.

== Routing ==
The 20587 / 58 Puri–Sainagar Shirdi Express runs from Puri via Khurda Road Junction, Bhubaneswar, Sambalpur Junction, and takes reversal at Titlagarh Junction, and runs via Raipur Junction, Durg Junction, Gondia Junction, Nagpur Junction, Bhusaval Junction, Manmad Junction to Sainagar Shirdi.

== Traction ==
earlier was Golden Rock-based WDG-3A or WDM-3A and WDM-3D. As this route is electrified, a Visakhapatnam-based WAP-7 electric locomotive pulls the train to Titlagarh Junction. Later a Itarsi Loco Shed-based WAP-7 electric locomotive pulls the train to its destination.
