= Indore–Puri Humsafar Express =

Train in India

Indore - Puri Humsafar Express
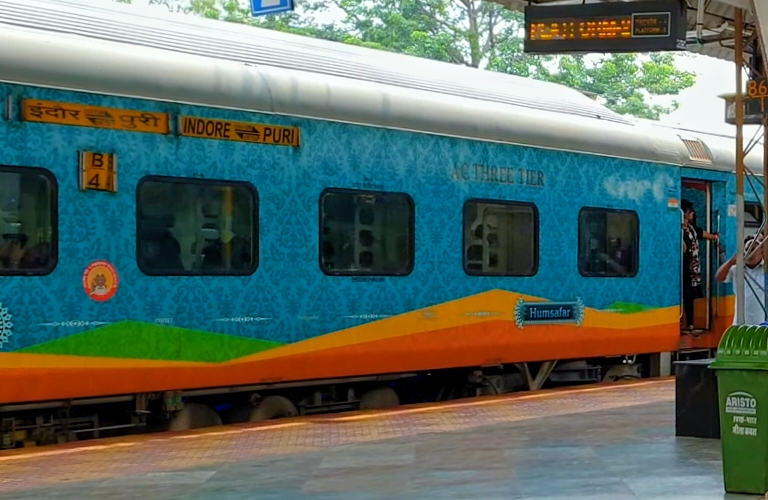
- Indore - Puri Humsafar At Durg Junction railway station

Overview
- Service type: Humsafar Express
- First service: 12 May 2018; 7 years ago
- Current operator: Western Railways

Route
- Termini: Indore (INDB); Puri (PURI)
- Stops: 14
- Distance travelled: 1,602 km (995 mi)
- Average journey time: 30 hrs 45 mins
- Service frequency: Weekly
- Train number: 20917 / 20918

On-board services
- Class: AC 3 tier
- Seating arrangements: Yes
- Sleeping arrangements: Yes
- Catering facilities: Available
- Observation facilities: Large windows
- Baggage facilities: Yes

Technical
- Rolling stock: LHB Humsafar
- Track gauge: 1,676 mm (5 ft 6 in)
- Operating speed: 51 km/h (32 mph)
Route map
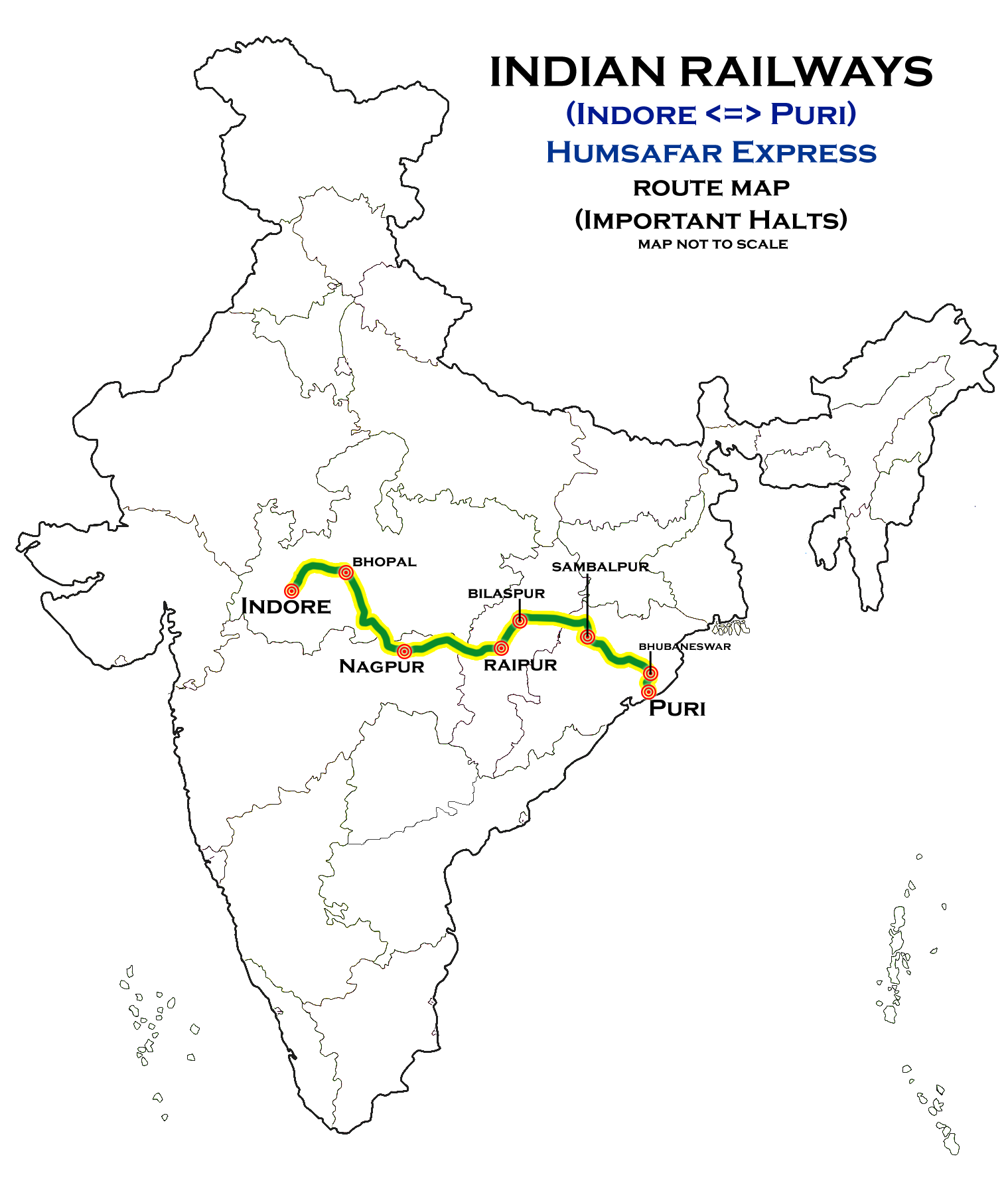

The Indore - Puri Humsafar Express is a superfast express train of the Indian Railways connecting Indore Junction in Madhya Pradesh and Puri in Odisha. It is currently being operated with the train numbers 20917/20918 on a weekly basis.

== Coach composition ==
The train is completely 3-tier AC sleeper designed by Indian Railways with features of LED screen display to show information about stations, train speed etc. and will have announcement system as well, Vending machines for tea, coffee and milk, Bio toilets in compartments as well as CCTV cameras.

== Service ==
The 20917/Indore - Puri Humsafar Express has an average speed of 52 km/h and covers 1602 km in 30 hrs 45 mins.

The 20918/Puri - Indore Humsafar Express has an average speed of 45 km/h and covers 1602 km in 35 hrs 30 mins.

== Route and halts ==
The important halts of the train are :

- Indore Junction
- Bhopal Junction
- Itarsi Junction
- Nagpur Junction
- Gondia Junction
- Rajnandgaon
- Durg Junction
- Raipur Junction
- Bilaspur Junction
- Jharsuguda Road
- Sambalpur City
- Angul
- Bhubaneswar
- Khurda Road Junction
- Puri

== Schedule ==
Train Number	Station Code	Departure Station	Departure Time	Departure Day	Arrival Station	Arrival Time	Arrival Day
20917	INDB	Indore Junction	13:20 PM	Tue	Puri	20:05 PM	Wed
20918	PURI	Puri	23:55 PM	Wed	Indore Junction	11:25 AM	Fri

== Rake sharing ==
The train shares its rake with 20915/20916 Lingampalli - Indore Humsafar Express.

== Traction ==
Both trains are hauled by a WAP 5 (HOG) equipped locomotive of Vadodara Loco Shed on its entire journey.

== See also ==
- Humsafar Express
