= Rourkela–Bhubaneswar Intercity Express =

Indian Railways express train

Rourkela – Bhubaneswar Intercity Express
Overview
- Service type: Express
- First service: 13 February 2010
- Current operator: South Eastern Railway zone

Route
- Termini: Rourkela Junction; Bhubaneswar
- Stops: 15
- Distance travelled: 420 km (261 mi)
- Average journey time: 7 hours 20 mins
- Service frequency: Daily
- Train number: 22839 / 22840

On-board services
- Classes: AC chair car, second sitting, general unreserved
- Seating arrangements: Yes
- Sleeping arrangements: No
- Catering facilities: No

Technical
- Rolling stock: Standard Indian Railways Coaches
- Track gauge: 1,676 mm (5 ft 6 in)
- Operating speed: 57 km/h (35 mph)

The 22839 / 22840 Rourkela – Bhubaneswar Intercity Express is an express train belonging to Indian Railways South Eastern Railway zone that runs between Rourkela Junction and Bhubaneswar in India.

It operates as train number 22839 from Rourkela to Bhubaneswar and as train number 22840 in the reverse direction serving the states of Odisha.

== Coaches ==
The 22839 / 40 Rourkela Junction – Bhubaneswar Intercity Superfast Express has two AC chair car, four second sitting, six general unreserved & two SLR (seating with luggage rake) coaches .

As is customary with most train services in India, coach composition may be amended at the discretion of Indian Railways depending on demand.

== Service ==
The 22839 Rourkela Junction - Bhubaneswar Intercity Superfast Express covers the distance of 420 km (261 mi) in 7 hours 20 mins (57 km/h) and in 7 hours 20 mins as the 22840 Bhubaneswar - Rourkela Junction Intercity Superfast Express (57 km/h).

As the average speed of the train is higher than 55 km/h (34 mph), as per railway rules, its fare includes a Superfast surcharge.

== Routing ==
The 22839/22840 Rourkela-Bhubaneswar intercity superfast express runs from Rourkela Junction to Bhubaneswar via Jharsuguda Junction, Sambalpur City, Rairakhol,Angul, Talcher road, Meramandali, and Dhenkanal.

== Traction ==
As the route is fully electrified Electric locomotive WAP 7 from bondamunda Loco Shed pulls the train to its destination.
