= Bagdehi railway station =

Railway station in India

Bagdehi

General information
- Location: Bagdehi, Odisha; India
- Coordinates: 21°57′06″N 84°11′12″E
- System: Indian Railway Station
- Owner: Ministry of Railways, Indian Railways
- Line: Tatanagar–Bilaspur section
- Platforms: 3
- Tracks: 3

Construction
- Structure type: Standard (On Ground)
- Parking: No

Other information
- Status: Functioning
- Station code: BEH
- Zone(s): South Eastern Railway
- Division(s): Chakradharpur
Location
- Location within India Location within Odisha

Bagdehi railway station is a railway station on the South Eastern Railway network in the state of Odisha, India. It serves Bagdehi village. Its code is BEH. It has three platforms. Passenger, Express and Superfast trains halt at Bagdehi railway station.

== Major Trains ==
- Tapaswini Express
- Rourkela - Gunupur Rajya Rani Express
- Samaleshwari Express
- Ispat Express
- South Bihar Express

== See also ==
- Jharsuguda District
