= Electric Loco Shed, Angul =

Loco shed in Odisha, India

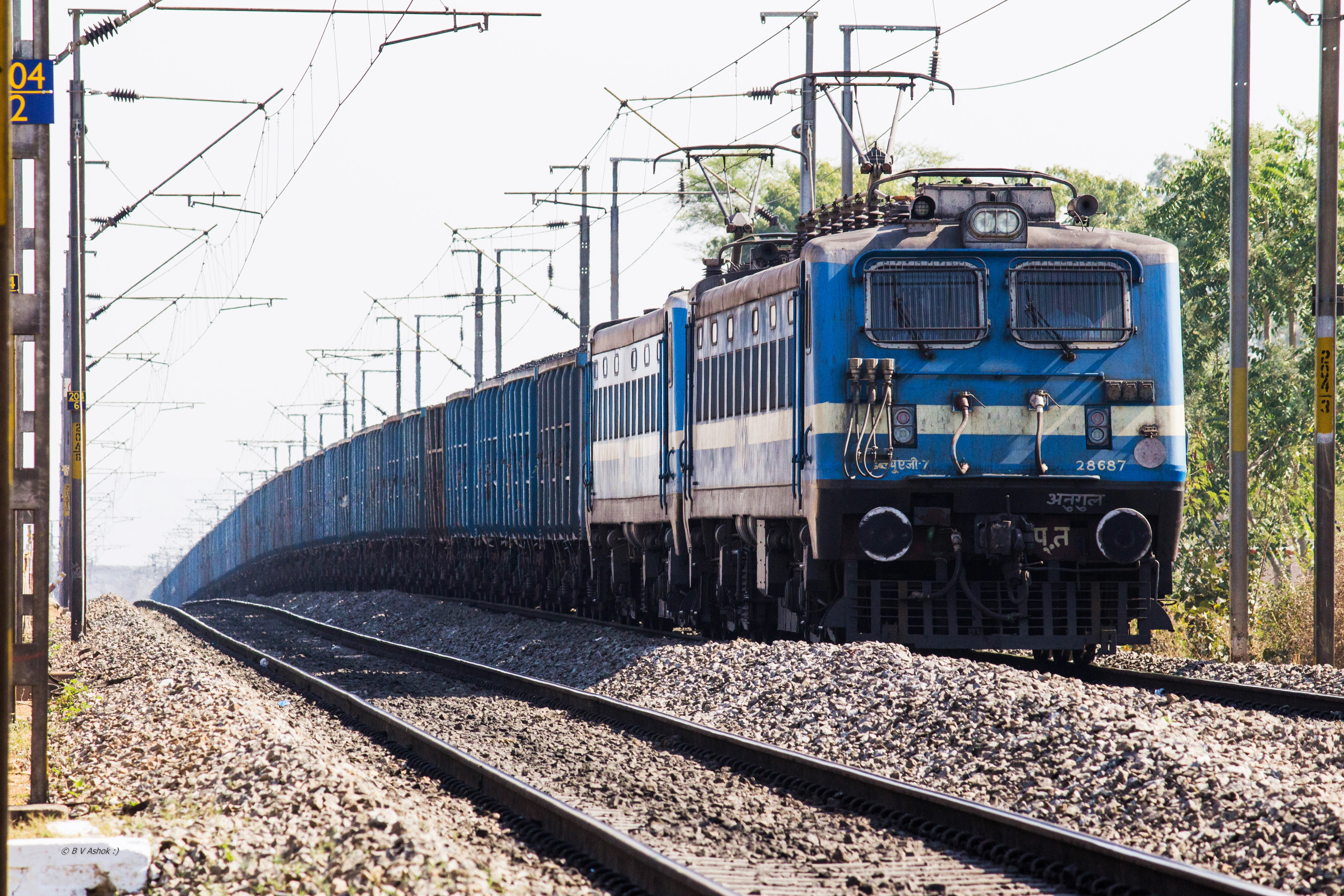
- Angul based WAG-7 twins at Moula Ali.

- Location within Odisha

Location
- Location: Angul, Odisha
- Coordinates: 20.861610°N 85.099408°E

Characteristics
- Owner: Indian Railways
- Operator: East Coast Railway zone
- Depot code: ANGL
- Type: Engine shed
- Roads: 6
- Rolling stock: WAP-7; WAG-7; WAG-9

History
- Opened: 2005; 21 years ago
- Former rolling stock: WAM-4; WAG-5

Electric Loco Shed, Angul is a motive power depot performing locomotive maintenance and repair facility for electric locomotives of the Indian Railways, located at Angul of the East Coast Railway zone in Odisha, India. As of 1 June 2026, there are 301 locomotives in the shed.

== History ==
After Eastern Railway set a deadline to eliminate all steam locomotive operations by 1990, a push was given towards establishing electric locomotion as the primary motive power, and the Steam locomotive sheds were decommissioned. To meet the needs of exponentially increasing rail traffic on the new continuous broad gauge lines from Odisha to rest of India with the completion of gauge conversion, the Angul was selected by Indian railways for a new electric locomotive shed.

This shed was developed in 2005 and presently holding 180 WAG-7, 95 WAG-9 Locomotives only. Initially Diesel Loco Shed (DLS) was commissioned in Angul in 1999. In 2002 Indian railways decided to convert DLS to ELS for homing capacity of 50 Locos. In 2005 Angul DLS/ELS 50 Locos was converted to Electric Loco Shed Angul. Augmentation work from 105 Locos to 150 Locos is under progress. The shed Started life on paper as a diesel shed but soon converted to an electric shed. Locomotives were received even when the shed building was not complete. The WAM-4 and WAG-5 locos were brought from other sheds. In Feb 2006, all Angul WAM-4s have been transferred to VSKP, and henceforth, Angul will home only goods locos like WAG-5s and WAG-7s.

In the late 2003 WAG-5 were introduced which stayed until late 2010, when they were transferred to VKSP. It later got a large fleet of WAG-7 locos from other sheds.

== Operations ==
Being one of the two electric engine sheds in East Coast Railway, various major and minor maintenance schedules of electric locomotives are carried out here. It has the sanctioned capacity of 175 engine units. Beyond the operating capacity, this shed houses a total of 275 engine units, all WAG-7 & WAG-9 units. Electric loco Shed, Angul is now housing a large fleet of WAG-7 in Indian Railways and it caters to many long-distance electric trains.

Like all locomotive sheds, ANGL does regular maintenance, overhaul and repair including painting and washing of locomotives. It not only attends to locomotives housed at ANGL but to ones coming in from other sheds as well. It has four pit lines for loco repair. Locomotives of Angul ELS along with VSKP ELS were the regular links for all freight trains running through odisha when widespread electrification of railway lines started in East coast Railways. ANGL locomotives are rarely also used for passenger trains as well.

== Livery and markings ==
Angul WAG-7 & WAG-9 locomotives have a standardized livery all over India.

== Locomotives ==
Serial No.	Locomotive Class	Horsepower	Quantity
1.	WAP-7	6350	2
2.	WAG-7	5350	163
3.	WAG-9	6120	141
Total locomotives active as of August 2026			306

== See also ==
- Angul railway station
