= Sambalpur–Rayagada Intercity Express =

Intercity Express
Overview
- Service type: Express
- Current operator: East Coast Railway zone

Route
- Termini: Sambalpur Junction; Rayagada
- Stops: 18
- Distance travelled: 323 km (201 mi)
- Average journey time: 6 hours 55 mins
- Service frequency: Daily
- Train number: 18301 / 18302

On-board services
- Classes: second seating, general unreserved
- Seating arrangements: Yes
- Sleeping arrangements: No
- Catering facilities: No

Technical
- Rolling stock: Standard Indian Railways Coaches
- Track gauge: 1,676 mm (5 ft 6 in)
- Operating speed: 49 km/h (30 mph)
Route map
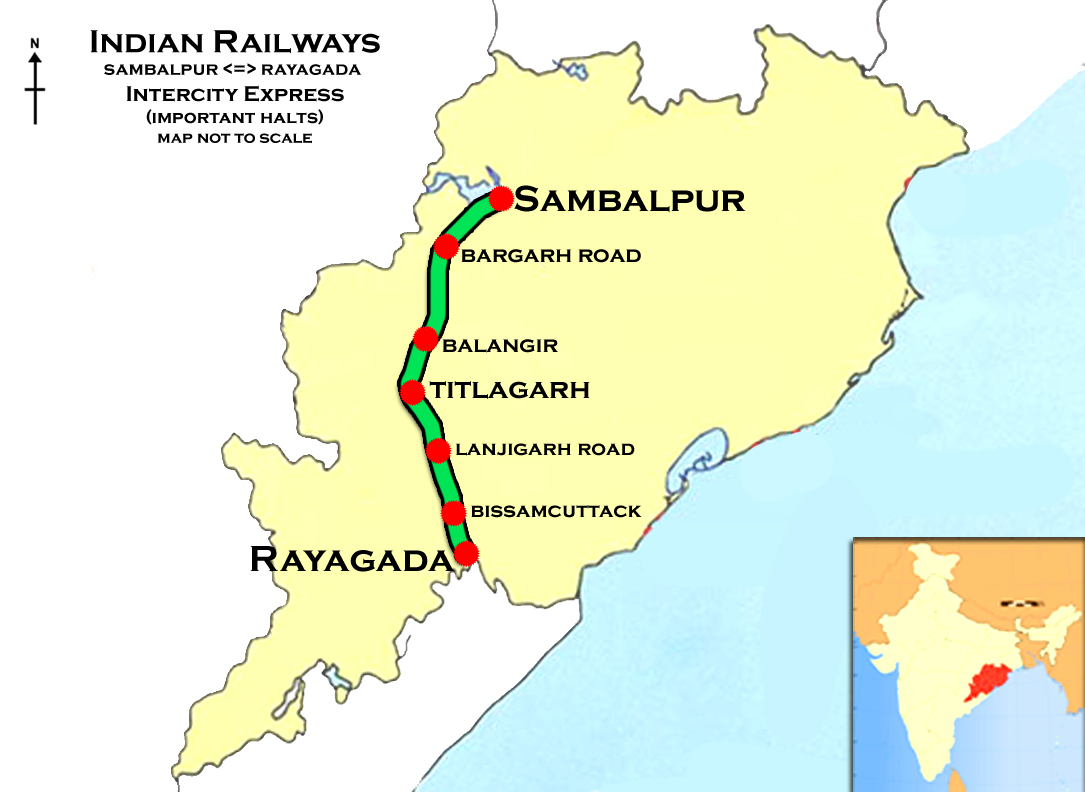

The 18301 / 02 Intercity Express is an express train belonging to Indian Railways East Coast Railway zone that runs between Sambalpur Junction and Rayagada in India.

It operates as train number 18301 from Sambalpur Junction to Rayagada and as train number 18302 in the reverse direction serving the states of Odisha.

== Coaches ==
The 18301 / 02 Intercity Express has eight general unreserved & two SLR (seating with luggage rake) coaches. It does not carry a pantry car coach.

As is customary with most train services in India, coach composition may be amended at the discretion of Indian Railways depending on demand.

== Service ==
The 18301 Sambalpur Junction - Rayagada Intercity Express covers the distance of 323 km (201 mi) in 7 hours 00 mins (46 km/h) and in 6 hours 10 mins as the 18302 Rayagada - Sambalpur Junction Intercity Express (52 km/h).

As the average speed of the train is lower than 55 km/h (34 mph), as per railway rules, its fare doesn't includes a Superfast surcharge.

== Routing ==
The 18301 / 02 Intercity Express runs from Sambalpur Junction via Titlagarh Junction to Rayagada.

== Traction ==
As the route is completely electrified, a Visakhapatnam based electric locomotive WAG 5A which pulls the train to its destination. It was the first train to get permanentE-Linkin Sambalpur-Titlagarh section.
