= Indore - Charlapalli Humsafar Express (Train: 20915/20916) =

Express train between Indore and Hyderabad, India

Charlapalli - Indore Junction Humsafar Express
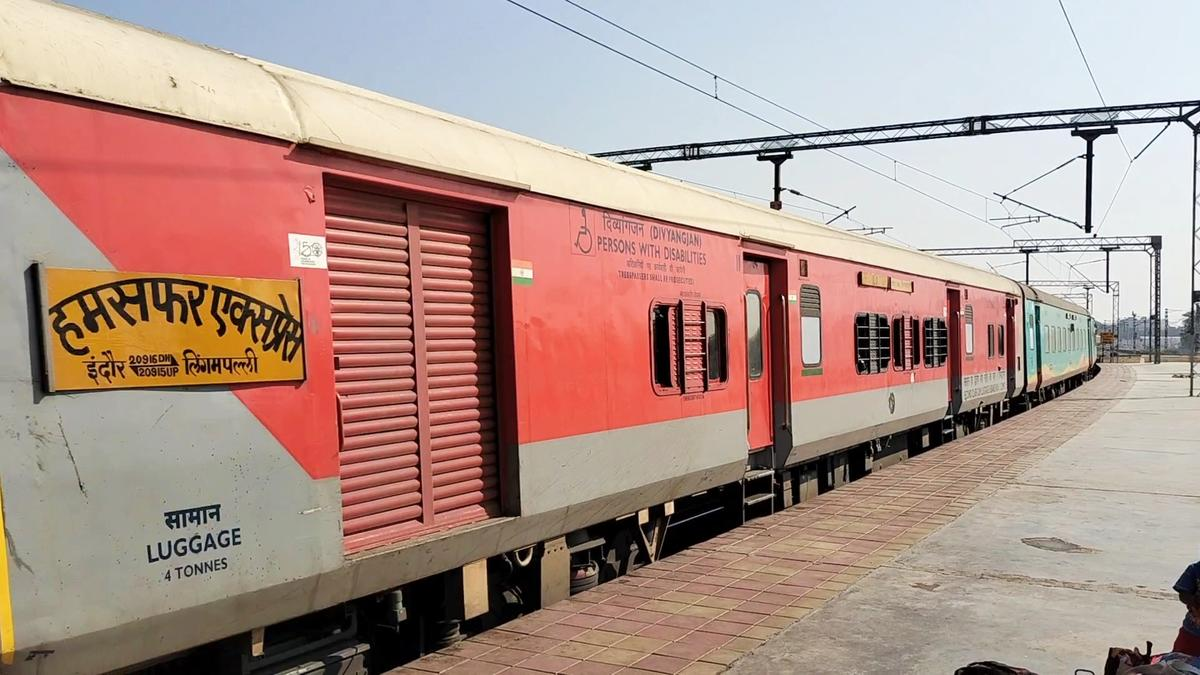

Overview
- Service type: Humsafar
- Status: Operational
- Locale: Telangana, Karnataka, Maharashtra, Gujarat and Madhya Pradesh
- First service: 26 May 2018; 8 years ago
- Current operator: Western Railway

Route
- Termini: Charlapalli (CHZ); Indore (INDB)
- Stops: 13
- Distance travelled: 1,577 km (980 mi)
- Average journey time: 27 hours
- Service frequency: Weekly (Note: Runs once in a week for every direction.)
- Train number: 20915 / 20916
- Lines used: Mumbai–Chennai line; New Delhi–Mumbai main line; Indore–Dahod line

On-board services
- Classes: AC 3 Tier & Sleeper
- Sleeping arrangements: Bedroll / Linen is provided
- Catering facilities: On-board catering & e-catering
- Observation facilities: Large windows in all carriages
- Other facilities: Smoke alarms; CCTV cameras; Baby changing table; Odour-control system; Passenger information system

Technical
- Rolling stock: LHB Humsafar
- Track gauge: 5 ft 6 in (1,676 mm) broad gauge
- Operating speed: 130 km/h (81 mph) (top operating speed); 59 km/h (37 mph) (average including halts)

The 20915 / 20916 Indore - Cherlapally Humsafar Express is an express train of the Indian Railways connecting Indore Junction in Madhya Pradesh and Charlapalli railway station in Hyderabad, Telangana. Train no. 20915 leaves Indore Junction at 11:15 every Saturday and arrives Cherlapally at 2:15 the next Sunday. The return train 20916 leaves Charlapalli at 20:45 every Sunday and arrives Indore Junction at 00:25 the next Tuesday. Charlapalli-Inodre Humsafar Express runs with an average speed of 58 km/h.

== Coach composition ==
The train composes of Sleeper and 3-tier AC sleeper designed by Indian Railways with features of LED screen display to show information about stations, train speed etc. and will have announcement system as well, Vending machines for tea, coffee and milk, bio toilets in compartments as well as CCTV cameras.

Loco	1	2	3	4	5	6	7	8	9	10	11	12	13	14	15	16	17	18	19
	SLR	B10	B9	B8	B7	B6	B5	B4	B3	B2	B1	PC	S6	S5	S4	S3	S2	S1	EOG

== Service ==
The 20915/Charlapalli - Indore Humsafar Express has an average speed of 54 km/h and covers 1539 km in 28 hrs 15 mins.

The 20916/Indore - Charlapalli Humsafar Express has an average speed of 51 km/h and covers 1539 km in 30 hrs 15 mins.

== Route and halts ==
- Charlapally
- Secunderabad
- Lingampalli
- Vikarabad Junction
- Kalaburagi Junction
- Solapur
- Pune Junction
- Panvel
- Vasai Road
- Surat
- Vadodara Junction
- Ratlam Junction
- Ujjain Junction
- Indore Junction

== Schedule ==
Train Number	Station Code	Departure Station	Departure Time	Departure Day	Arrival Station	Arrival Time	Arrival Day
20915	CHZ	Charlapalli railway station	20:45 PM	Sun	Indore Junction	01:35 AM	Tue
20916	INDB	Indore Junction	07:30 AM	Sat	Charlapalli railway station	14:15 PM	Sun

== Rake sharing ==
The train shares its rake with 20917/20918 Indore - Puri Humsafar Express.

== Traction ==
Both trains are hauled by a Vadodara-based WAP-5 / WAP-7 locomotive on its entire journey.

== See also ==
- Humsafar Express
