= Meramandali railway station =

Railway station in Odisha, India

Meramandali

General information
- Location: Kharagprasad, Meramandali, Dhenkanal district, Odisha; India
- Coordinates: 20°48′09″N 85°18′18″E
- Elevation: 74 metres (243 ft)
- System: Indian Railways station
- Owner: Indian Railways
- Line: Cuttack–Sambalpur line
- Platforms: 6
- Tracks: 8

Construction
- Structure type: Standard (on ground)
- Parking: Yes

Other information
- Status: Functioning
- Station code: MRDL
- Zone(s): East Coast Railway
- Division(s): Khurda Road

History
- Opened: 1998

Services
Preceding station	Indian Railways	Following station
Budhapank towards ?	East Coast Railway zone Cuttack–Sambalpur line	Nayabhagirathipur towards ?
Location
- Location within India Location within Odisha

Meramandali railway station is a railway station on Cuttack–Sambalpur line under the Khurda Road railway division of the East Coast Railway zone. The railway station is situated at Kharagprasad, Meramandali in Dhenkanal district of the Indian state of Odisha.

== Train Halts ==
Meramandali railway station serves as a halt for several passenger and express trains on the Cuttack–Sambalpur line. As of 2025, the station accommodates 16 halting trains, connecting various cities across India.

Train No.	Train Name	Route
18125	Puri–Rourkela Intercity Express	Puri to Rourkela
18126	Rourkela–Puri Intercity Express	Rourkela to Puri
12893	Bhubaneswar–purunacuttack Superfast Express	Bhubaneswar to Purunacuttack
12894	Purunacuttack–Bhubaneswar Superfast Express	Purunacuttack to Bhubaneswar
18425	Puri–Durg Express	Puri to Durg
18426	Durg–Puri Express	Durg to Puri
22839	Rourkela –Bhubaneswar intercity superfast Express	Rourkela to Bhubaneswar
22840	Bhubaneswar - Rourkela intercity superfast express	Bhubaneswar to Rourkela
18303	Sambalpur –puri Intercity Express	Sambalpur to Puri
18304	Puri–sambalpur Intercity Express	Puri to Sambalpur
18313	Bhubaneswar New Weekly Special	Boudh to Bhubaneswar New
18314	Boudh weekly express	Bhubaneswar New to Boudh
68421	Angul - Puri fast memu special	Angul to Puri
68422	Puri - Angul fast memu special	Puri to Angul
68413	Talcher–Puri MEMU Special	Talcher to Puri
68414	Puri–Talcher MEMU Special	Puri to Talcher
