= Sambalpur City railway station =

Railway station in Odisha, India

Sambalpur City railway station is a railway station in the outskirts of Sambalpur on the East Coast Railway network in the state of Odisha, India. It serves Sambalpur city. Its code is SBPY. Passenger, Express and Superfast trains halt at Sambalpur City railway station.

== Major trains ==
- Rourkela–Gunupur Rajya Rani Express
- Bokaro Steel City–Bhubaneswar Garib Rath Express
- Valsad–Puri Superfast Express
- Indore–Puri Humsafar Express
- Rourkela–Bhubaneswar Intercity Express
- Bhubaneswar–Anand Vihar Weekly Superfast Express
- Bhubaneswar Rajdhani Express
- Puri Rourkela Vande Bharat Express

== See also ==
- Sambalpur district
