= Tapaswini Express =

Train in India

Overview
- Service type: Express
- Locale: Odisha & Jharkhand
- First service: 15 August 1998; 28 years ago
- Current operator: East Coast Railway

Route
- Termini: Puri (PURI); Hatia (HTE)
- Stops: 24
- Distance travelled: 689 km (428 mi)
- Average journey time: 16 hours
- Service frequency: Daily
- Train number: 18451 / 18452

On-board services
- Classes: AC First Class (1A), AC 2 Tier (2A), AC 3 Tier (3A), AC 3 Tier Economy (3E), Sleeper (SL), General (Unreserved)
- Seating arrangements: Yes
- Sleeping arrangements: Yes
- Catering facilities: On-board catering E-catering
- Observation facilities: Large windows
- Baggage facilities: Available
- Other facilities: Below the seats

Technical
- Rolling stock: LHB coach
- Track gauge: 1,676 mm (5 ft 6 in) (Broad Gauge)
- Operating speed: 55 km/h (34 mph) average with halts
Route map
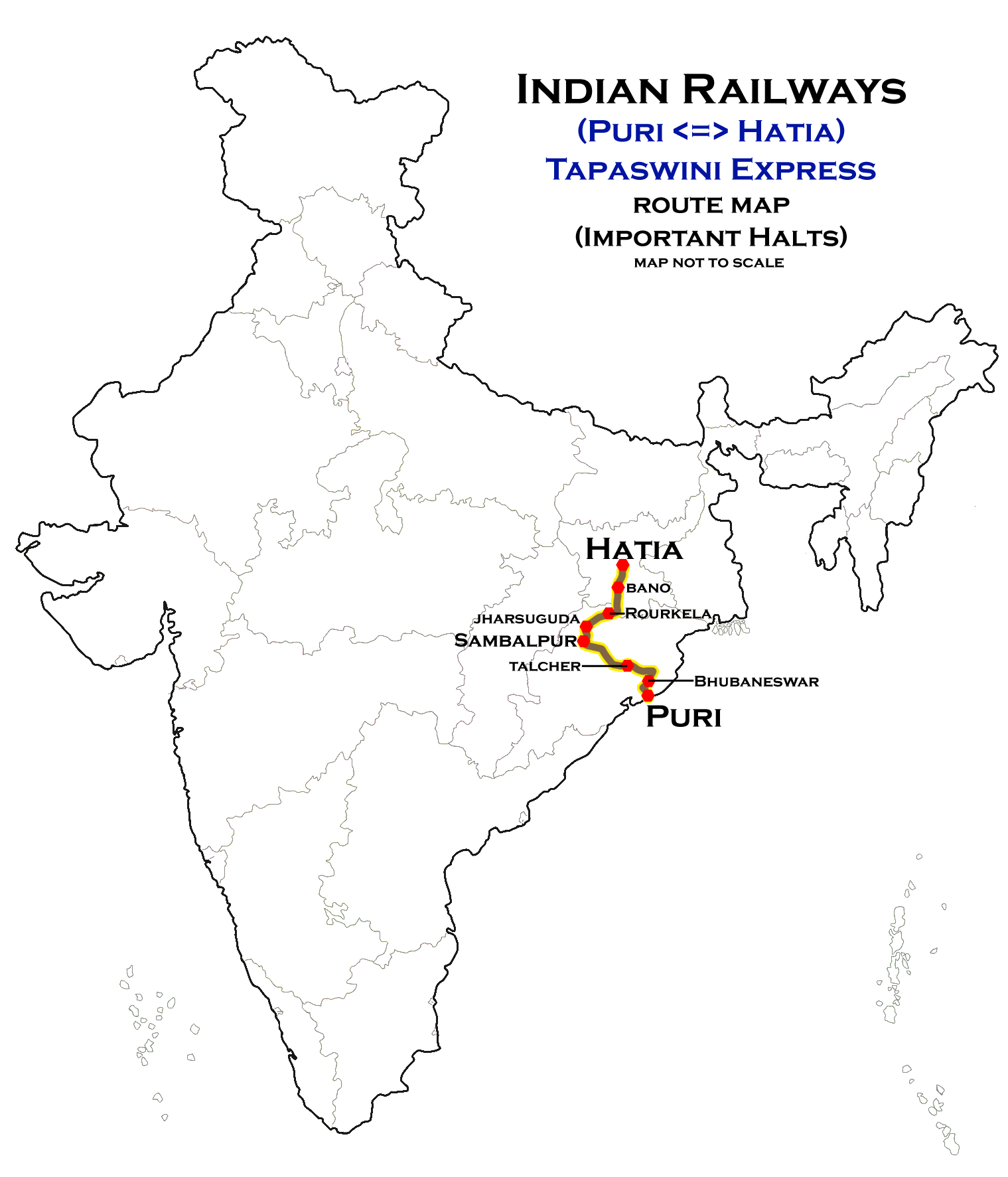

The 18451 / 18452 Tapaswini Express is daily Express train between Hatia and Puri. The train was the first Express train to be introduced with a route via Bhubaneswar, Dhenkanal, Talcher, Sambalpur. 18451 UP departs Hatia at 14:30 and reaches Puri at 07:00 every day. The 18452 DN departs Puri at 20:00 and reaches Hatia at 12:00 every day.

This train is named after famous Odia book Tapaswini written by 19th century Odia poet Swabhabkabi Gangadhar Meher.

== Route & halts ==
- PURI – Puri
- KUR – Khurda Road Junction
- BBS – Bhubaneswar
- CTC – Cuttack Junction
- DNKL – Dhenkanal
- TLHR – Talcher (Train reverses direction)
- ANGL – Angul
- BONA – Boinda
- RAIR – Rairakhol
- SBP – Sambalpur Junction (Train reverses direction)
- RGL – Rengali
- JSG – Jharsuguda Junction
- BEH - Bagdehi
- BMB – Bamra
- GPH - Garpos
- GP – Rajgangpur
- KLG - Kalunga
- ROU – Rourkela Junction
- NXN - Nuagaon
- ORGA – Orga
- BANO – Bano
- PKF - Pokla
- GBX – Govindpur Road
- HTE – Hatia

== Schedule ==
Train number	Station code	Departure station	Departure time	Departure day	Arrival station	Arrival time	Arrival day
18451	HTE	Hatia	2:30 PM	Daily	Puri	7:00 AM	Daily (next day)
18452	PURI	Puri	8:00 PM	Daily	Hatia	12:00 PM	Daily (next day)

== Coach composition ==
The train has standard LHB rakes with max speed of 130 kmph.

- 1 AC I Tier
- 2 AC II Tier
- 5 AC III Tier
- 2 AC III Tier Economy
- 6 Sleeper coaches
- 4 General
- 1 Second-class Luggage/parcel van
- 1 Generator Car

Loco	1	2	3	4	5	6	7	8	9	10	11	12	13	14	15	16	17	18	19	20	21	22
	EOG	GEN	GEN	H1	A1	A2	B1	B2	B3	B4	B5	M1	M2	S1	S2	S3	S4	S5	S6	GEN	GEN	SLR

== Direction reversal ==
The train reverses its direction twice at;

- Talcher
- Sambalpur Junction.

== Traction ==
As the route is fully electrified, it is hauled by a Visakhapatnam Loco Shed / Tatanagar Loco Shed based WAP-7 electric locomotive from end to end.

== See also ==
- Bokaro Steel City–Bhubaneswar Garib Rath Express
- List of named passenger trains in India
- Express trains in India
- Indian Railways coaching stock
- Hatia railway station
- Puri railway station
- Talcher Road railway station
- Sambalpur Junction
