= Hirakud Express =

Train in India

Hirakud Superfast Express
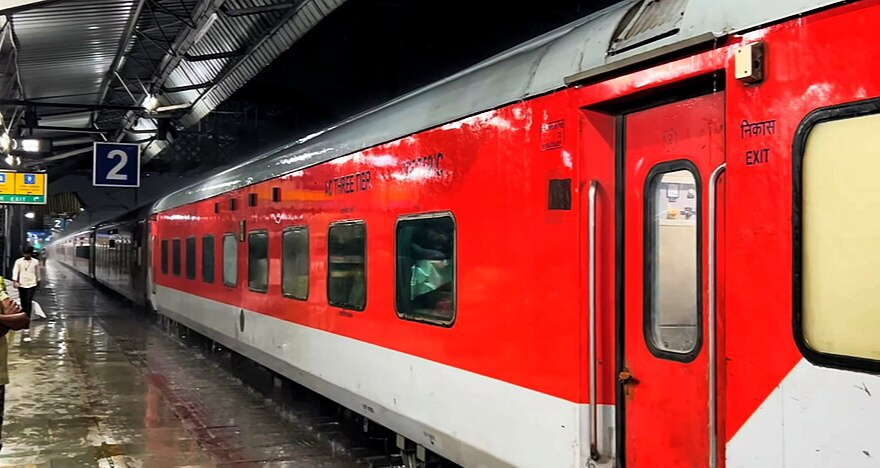
- Hirakud Superfast Express at Jalandhar City Jn.

Overview
- Service type: Swarna Jayanti Express
- Locale: Andhra Pradesh, Odisha, Chhattisgarh, Madhya Pradesh, Uttar Pradesh, Delhi, Haryana, Punjab
- First service: 1 July 1992; 34 years ago
- Current operator: South Coast Railway

Route
- Termini: Visakhapatnam (VSKP); Amritsar (ASR)
- Stops: 45
- Distance travelled: 2,584 km (1,606 mi)
- Average journey time: 45 hours 15 minutes
- Service frequency: Tri-weekly
- Train number: 20807 / 20808

On-board services
- Classes: AC 2 Tier, AC 3 Tier, Sleeper Class, General Unreserved
- Seating arrangements: Yes
- Sleeping arrangements: Yes
- Catering facilities: Available
- Observation facilities: Large windows
- Baggage facilities: Available
- Other facilities: Below the seats

Technical
- Rolling stock: LHB coach
- Track gauge: 1,676 mm (5 ft 6 in)
- Operating speed: 57 km/h (35 mph) average including halts.
Route map
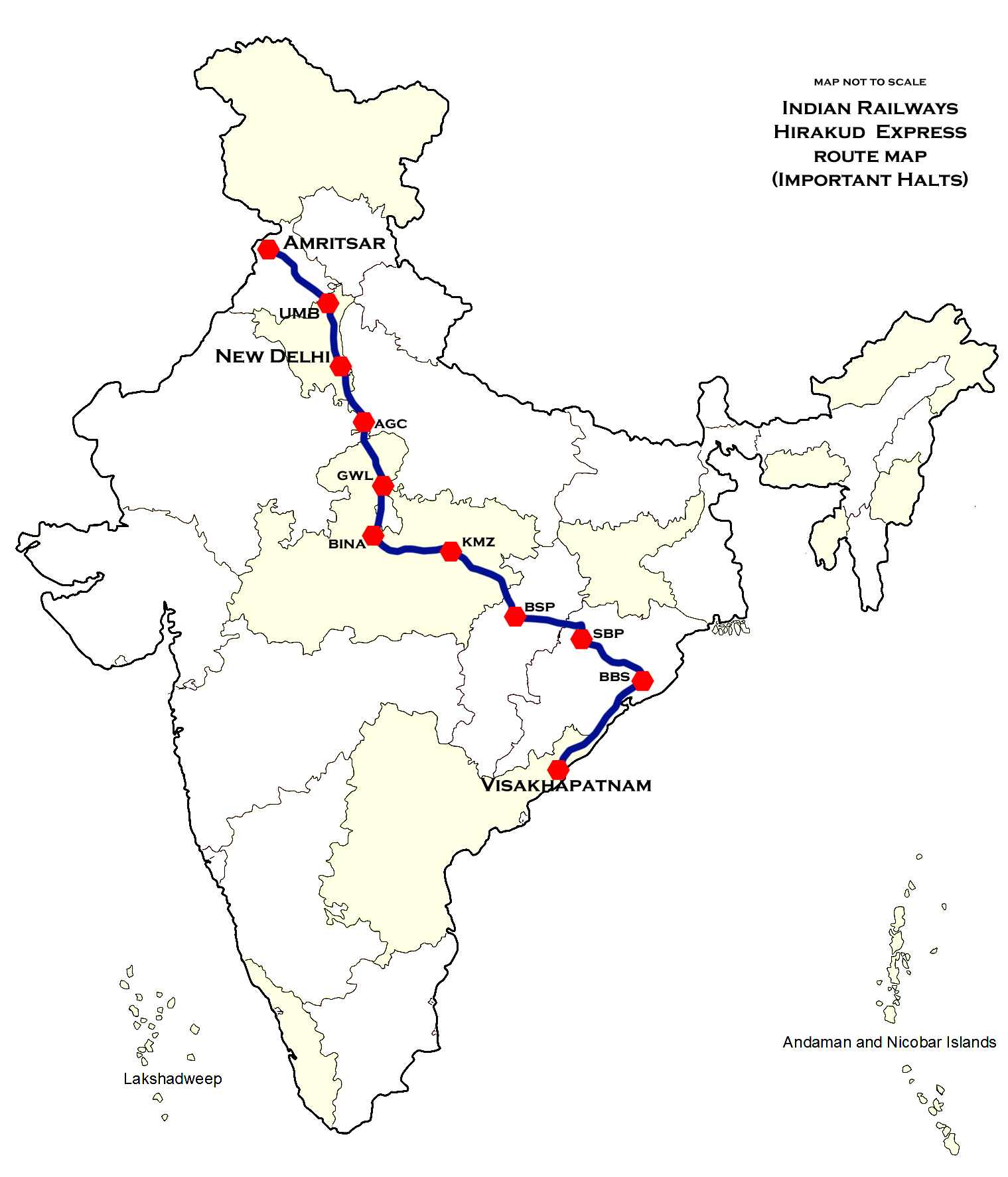

The 20807 / 20808 Hirakud Superfast Express is a superfast train which runs between Amritsar and Visakhapatnam. Hira means diamond and Kud means island in Sambalpuri language spoken in Western Odisha. Sambalpur was famous as an ancient diamond mine. Hirakud Express is named after famous Hirakud Dam in Sambalpur, Odisha which is longest dams of India.

== History ==
It was initially introduced between Sambalpur and Hazrat Nizamuddin railway station (Delhi) in 1992 as 4087/4088 Hirakud Express with reversals at Katni and Jharsuguda. For the 1st 10 yrs Hirakud Express was covering 1,394.2 km (866 mi) kms in 25 hours 30 minutes running at 54.27 km/h (33.72 mph) speed. Later in 2002 it was extended to Bhubaneswar with number change to 8407/8408 with added reversal at Talcher. Timings were same in Sambalpur - Hazrat Nizamuddin railway station and vice versa direction. In 2012, Hirakud Express was extended to Visakhapatnam from Bhubaneswar and Amritsar from Hazrat Nizamuddin railway station and number was changed to 18507/18508. The 18507/18508 Hirakud Express was taking a whooping 47 hours to cover 2,584.8 km (1,606 mi) running at 55 km/h (34 mph) speed. Train used reversal at 3 stops Talcher, Sambalpur and Jharsuguda as it was avoiding reversal at Katni by bypassing via Katni Murwara Junction. From 2017 onwards, with the inauguration of Jharsuguda Road, bypass station for Jharsuguda, the train uses reversal at Talcher and Sambalpur only.

== Coach composition ==
The coach composition of the 20807/20808 Hirakud Express is:

- 1 AC 2 Tier
- 4 AC 3 Tier
- 6 Sleeper Class
- 4 Second Class(Unreserved)
- 1 Pantry Car
- 1 EOG
- 1 SRL

From Visakhapatnam to Amritsar

Loco	1	2	3	4	5	6	7	8	9	10	11	12	13	14	15	16	17	18
	EOG	GEN	S1	S2	S3	S4	S5	PC	S6	A1	B1	B2	B3	B4	GEN	GEN	GEN	SLR

From Amritsar to Visakhapatnam

Loco	1	2	3	4	5	6	7	8	9	10	11	12	13	14	15	16	17	18
	SLR	GEN	GEN	GEN	B4	B3	B2	B1	A1	S6	PC	S5	S4	S3	S2	S1	GEN	EOG

== Timetable ==
- 20807- Starts from Visakhapatnam every Saturday, Tuesday and Friday at 00.10 am & reaches Amritsar Junction on 3rd day at 21.25 pm.
- 20808- Starts from Amritsar Jn every Wednesday, Saturday and Sunday at 23.55 pm & and reaches Visakhapatnam on 3rd day at 21.10 pm.

== Route & halts ==
- Visakhapatnam
- Vizianagaram Junction
- Srikakulam Road
- Brahmapur
- Khurda Road Junction
- Bhubaneswar
- Talcher
- Angul
- Sambalpur Junction
- Jharsuguda Road
- Champa Junction
- Bilaspur Junction
- Anuppur Junction
- Shahdol
- Umaria
- Katni Murwara Junction
- Damoh
- Saugor
- Virangana Lakshmibai Jhansi Junction
- Gwalior Junction
- Agra Cantonment
- Mathura Junction
- Hazrat Nizamuddin railway station
- New Delhi
- Panipat Junction
- Kurukshetra Junction
- Ambala Cantonment Junction
- Ludhiana Junction
- Jalandhar City Junction
- Amritsar

== Rake sharing ==
The train shares its rake with 20811/20812 Visakhapatnam–Hazur Sahib Nanded Superfast Express.

== Traction ==
It is hauled by a Visakhapatnam Loco Shed based WAP-7 electric locomotive on its entire journey.

== See also ==
- Indian Railways coaching stock
