= Cuttack Junction railway station =

Railway station in Odisha, India

Cuttack Junction
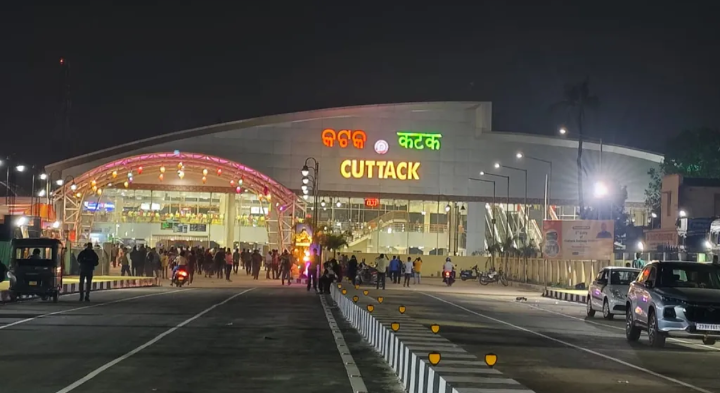
- East Entrance of Cuttack Railway Station

General information
- Location: Cuttack, Odisha; India
- Coordinates: 20°27′56″N 85°54′06″E
- Elevation: 36 m (118 ft)
- System: Indian Railways junction station
- Owner: Indian Railways
- Operator: East Coast Railway
- Lines: Kharagpur–Puri line, Cuttack–Paradip line, Cuttack–Sambalpur line
- Platforms: 5
- Tracks: 5 ft 6 in (1,676 mm) broad gauge

Construction
- Structure type: Standard (on-ground station)
- Parking: Available

Other information
- Status: Functioning
- Station code: CTC
- Zone(s): East Coast Railway
- Division(s): Khurda Road

History
- Opened: 1896; 130 years ago

Services
Preceding station	Indian Railways	Following station
Kendrapara Road towards Kharagpur Junction	East Coast Railway zone Kharagpur–Puri line	Katha Jori towards Puri
Kendrapara Road towards Sambalpur Junction	East Coast Railway zone Cuttack-Sambalpur line	Terminus
Terminus	East Coast Railway zone Cuttack-Paradip line	Mattagajpur towards Paradeep
Location
- Location within Odisha Location within India
- Interactive map

Cuttack Junction railway station, (station code CTC), is a railway junction and serves Cuttack in the Indian state of Odisha. Cuttack Junction railway station is one of the busiest railway station in Odisha. (Note: Fourth busiest railway station of Odisha after Bhubaneswar railway station, Khurda Road, Puri railway station.)

== History ==
During the period 1893 to 1896, 1,287 km (800 mi) of East Coast State Railway was built and opened to traffic. It necessitated construction of some of the largest bridges across rivers like Brahmani, Kathajodi, Kuakhai, Mahanadi (longest river of odisha) and Birupa. Cuttack station was connected to the Indian railway network in 1899.

Narendra Modi (Prime Minister of India) has laid the foundation of redevelopment work of Cuttack railway station.

=== Railway Organisation ===
The Cuttack station is operating under Khurda Road railway division of East Coast Railway zone.

Cuttack railway station is amongst the top hundred booking stations of Indian Railways.

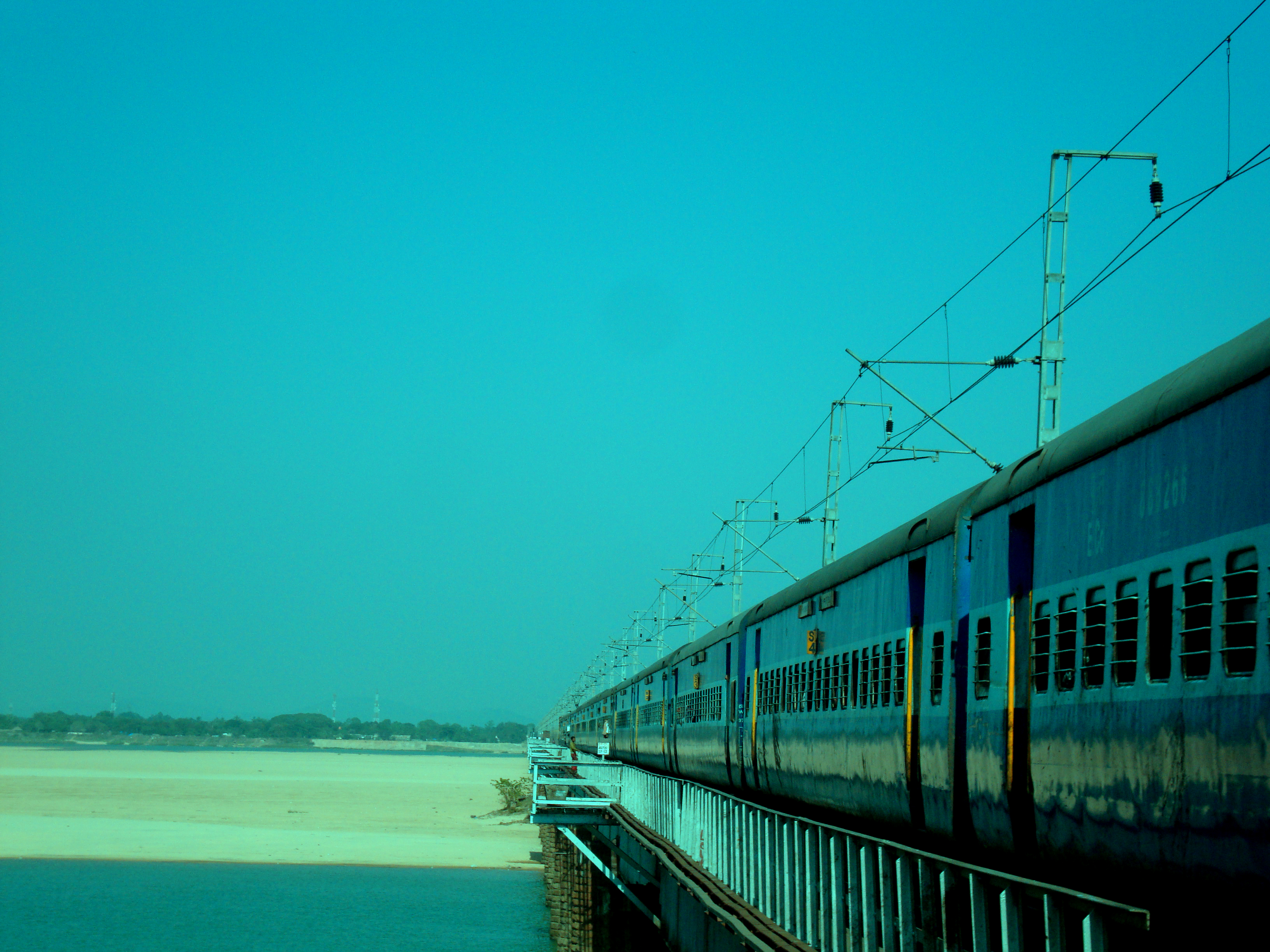
Train Passing through Mahanadi Bridge in Cuttack.
