= Jharsuguda Junction railway station =

Railway station in Odisha, India

Jharsuguda Junction
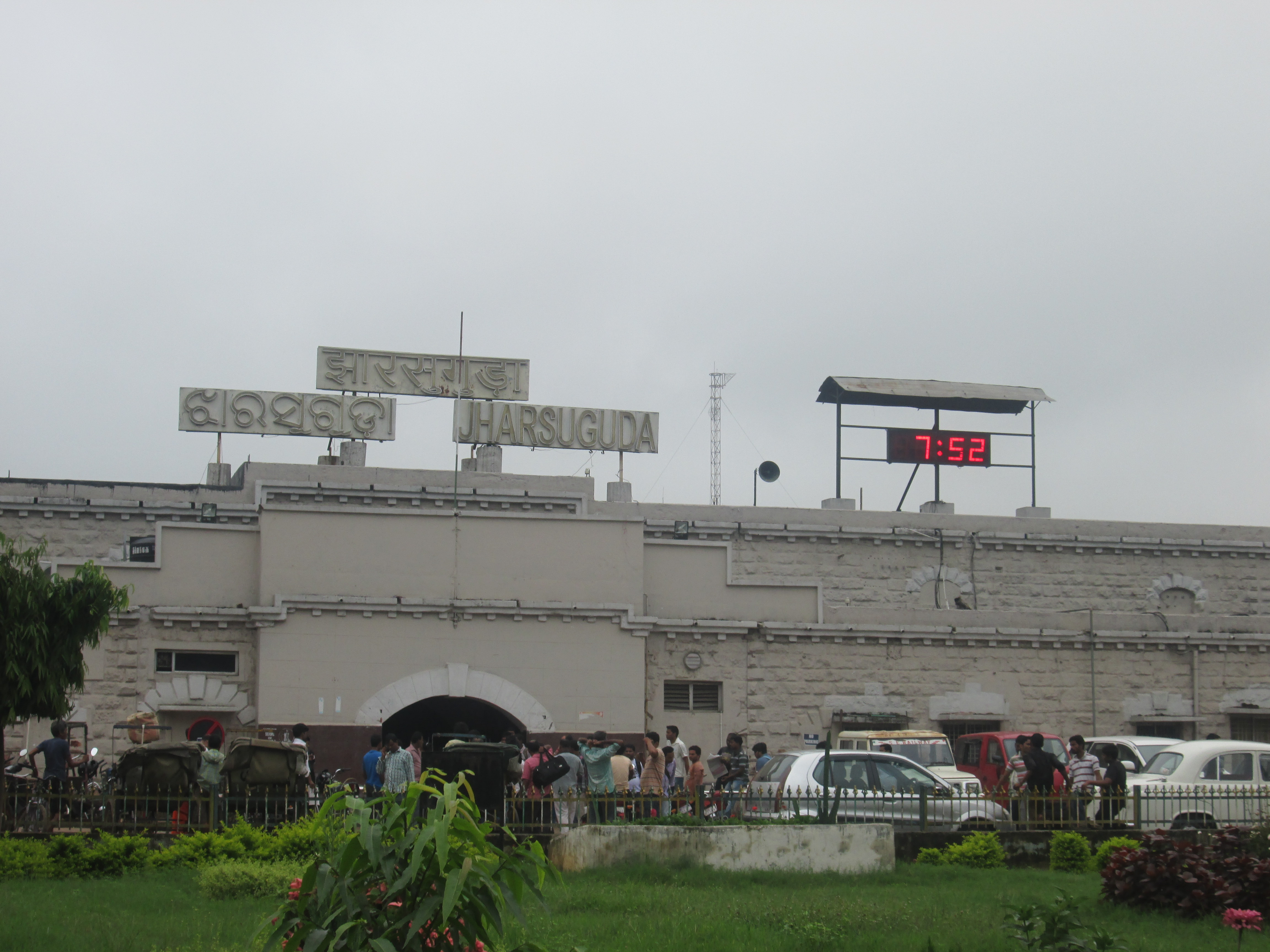

General information
- Location: Jharsuguda, Odisha; India
- Coordinates: 21°51′47″N 84°01′05″E
- Elevation: 218 m (715 ft)
- System: Indian Railways junction station
- Lines: Tatanagar–Bilaspur section of Howrah–Nagpur–Mumbai line and Jharsuguda–Vizianagaram line
- Platforms: 5
- Tracks: 5 ft 6 in (1,676 mm) broad gauge

Construction
- Structure type: At grade
- Parking: Available

Other information
- Status: Functioning
- Station code: JSG
- Zone(s): South Eastern Railway
- Division(s): Chakradharpur

History
- Opened: 1891
- Electrified: 1969–70
- Former names: Bengal Nagpur Railway

Services
Preceding station	Indian Railways	Following station
Dhutra towards ?	South Eastern Railway zone Tatanagar–Bilaspur section of Howrah–Nagpur–Mumbai line	Ib towards ?
Terminus	East Coast Railway zone Jharsuguda–Vizianagaram line	Brundamal towards ?
Location
- Location within Odisha Location within India

Jharsuguda Junction railway station is a major railway junction located in the north-eastern part of the Indian state of Odisha and serves the Jharsuguda district.

== History ==
Jharsuguda railway station came with the opening of the Nagpur–Asansol main line of Bengal Nagpur Railway in 1891. It became a station on the crosscountry Howrah–Nagpur–Mumbai line in 1900. In 1960, Indian Railway took up three projects: the Kottavalasa–Koraput–Jeypore–Kirandaul line (Dandakaranya Project), the Titlagarh–Bolangir–Jharsuguda Project and the Rourkela–Kiriburu Project. All the three projects taken together were popularly known as the DBK Project or the Dandakaranya Bolangir Kiriburu Project. It was electrified in 1969–70.

== Geography ==
Jharsuguda is located nearby the Ib river valley. It serves Ib Valley Coalfield and a growing industrial area.

== Railway ==
As of 7 April, 135 trains (including weeklies and bi-weeklies) passed through Jharsuguda railway station.
