= Sambalpur Junction railway station =

Railway station in Odisha, India

Sambalpur Junction
- Sambalpur junction railway station

General information
- Location: Farm Road, Khetrajpur, Sambalpur, Odisha; India
- Coordinates: 21°28′59″N 83°57′40″E
- Elevation: 150 m (492 ft)
- System: Indian Railways junction station
- Owner: Indian Railways
- Lines: Jharsuguda–Vizianagaram line Cuttack–Sambalpur line,(Sambalpur–Gopalpur line via Phulbani proposed), (Sambalpur- Raigarh via Belpahar proposed)
- Platforms: 6 Platforms
- Tracks: 7 tracks 5 ft 6 in (1,676 mm) broad gauge

Construction
- Structure type: Standard (on-ground station)
- Parking: Available (free & paid)

Other information
- Status: Functioning
- Station code: SBP
- Zone(s): East Coast Railway
- Division(s): Sambalpur

History
- Opened: 1889

Passengers
- 140000 per day

Services
Preceding station	Indian Railways	Following station
Sambalpur Road towards ?	East Coast Railway zone Jharsuguda–Titlagarh branch line	Hirakud towards ?
Terminus	East Coast Railway zone Sambalpur–Barang branch line	Sambalpur Road towards ?
Location
- Location within Odisha Location within India

Sambalpur Junction railway station serves Sambalpur district in the Indian state of Odisha. It is a major railway junction in Odisha and headquarters of Sambalpur railway division. This railway station is the cleanest railway station of East Coast Railway declared by Indian Railway. There are four other railway stations serving Sambalpur, viz. Sambalpur Road railway station (SBPD), Sambalpur City railway station (SBPY), Hirakud (HKG), across the Mahanadi and Maneswar railway station (MANE). Locally this station is called Khetrajpur railway station since it is located in that area of the city. Sambalpur Junction is the oldest and one of the biggest and busiest railway stations of Odisha and East Coast Railway Division.

== History ==
The Sambalpur - Titilagarh Railway line forms a part at the Project to develop capacity for the export of two million tons of ore annually through the Visakhapatnam Port. The Project is the result at a tripartite agreement between the U.SA., Japan and our country. The Government of U.S.A. have agreed to make a loan at 20 million dollars and the loan from Japan would be in yens for an amount equivalent at 8 million dollars All negotiations in connection with this project have been carried on by the Ministry of Finance.

According to the present estimates construction of the railway line which is going to be 114 tows in length sanctioned on 24 April 1959 would cost Rs. 14.58 crores. That would be the construction part of it We would require some more money for import of diesel locomotives and all that For that we hope the United States loan will be available. The Sambalpur–Titilagarh line was opened to traffic in 1963. The Sambalpur- Titlagarh line was opened to traffic in April 1963. The Sambalpur–Talcher line was sanctioned in 1983 and was completed in 1998.

=== Railway Organization ===
Sambalpur Railway station is functioning under Sambalpur Division of East Coast Railway.

=== Doubling ===
Doubling of Sambalpur–Jharsuguda railway line is completed, and Sambalpur–Titlagarh has been also completed .

=== Electrification ===
Electrification of the Titlagarh–Sambalpur–Jharsuguda and Angul-Sambalpur sections were sanctioned in the Railway Budget for 2012–13. Electrified double tracks are now operational between Titlagarh–Sambalpur – Jharsuguda stations. Work of doubling and electrification between Sambalpur and Angul is in progress. In September 2015, the route has been electrified from Angul to Kerejanga and the work is expected to be completed in the upcoming 5 years.

== Amenities ==
Sambalpur railway station has a four-bedded dormitory. Other amenities at the railway station include computerized reservation offices, telephone booth, cloak room, waiting room and book stall.

== Passenger movement ==
11 train originate at Sambalpur and 56 trains (including weeklies and bi-weeklies) pass through this station.

Sambalpur railway station serves around 140,000 passengers every day.

== Expansion and requirement of new trains ==
With current infrastructure attaining full utilization, there is requirement of additional 2 platforms to accommodate more space for the station, with this the station shall have 7 platforms, along with platforms 1A and 2A. There is also a need to start commuter train service between Sambalpur and Angul Section and Sambalpur- Jharsuguda- Rourkela Section of East Coast Railway and South Eastern Railway respectively.
