= Dhenkanal railway station =

Railway station in Odisha, India

Dhenkanal

General information
- Location: Dhenkanal, Odisha; India
- Coordinates: 20°40′N 85°36′E
- Elevation: 61 m (200 ft)
- System: Indian Railways station
- Owner: East Coast Railway
- Line: Cuttack–Sambalpur line
- Platforms: 4
- Tracks: 5 tracks, 5 ft 6 in (1,676 mm) broad gauge

Construction
- Structure type: Standard (on-ground station)
- Parking: Available
- Accessible: Yes

Other information
- Status: Functioning
- Station code: DNKL
- Zone(s): East Coast Railway
- Division(s): Khurda Road

History
- Opened: 1922; 104 years ago

Passengers
- Daily: Above 2000
Location
- Location within Odisha Location within India

Dhenkanal Railway Station is a railway station which serves Dhenkanal district in Indian state of Odisha.

== Gallery ==
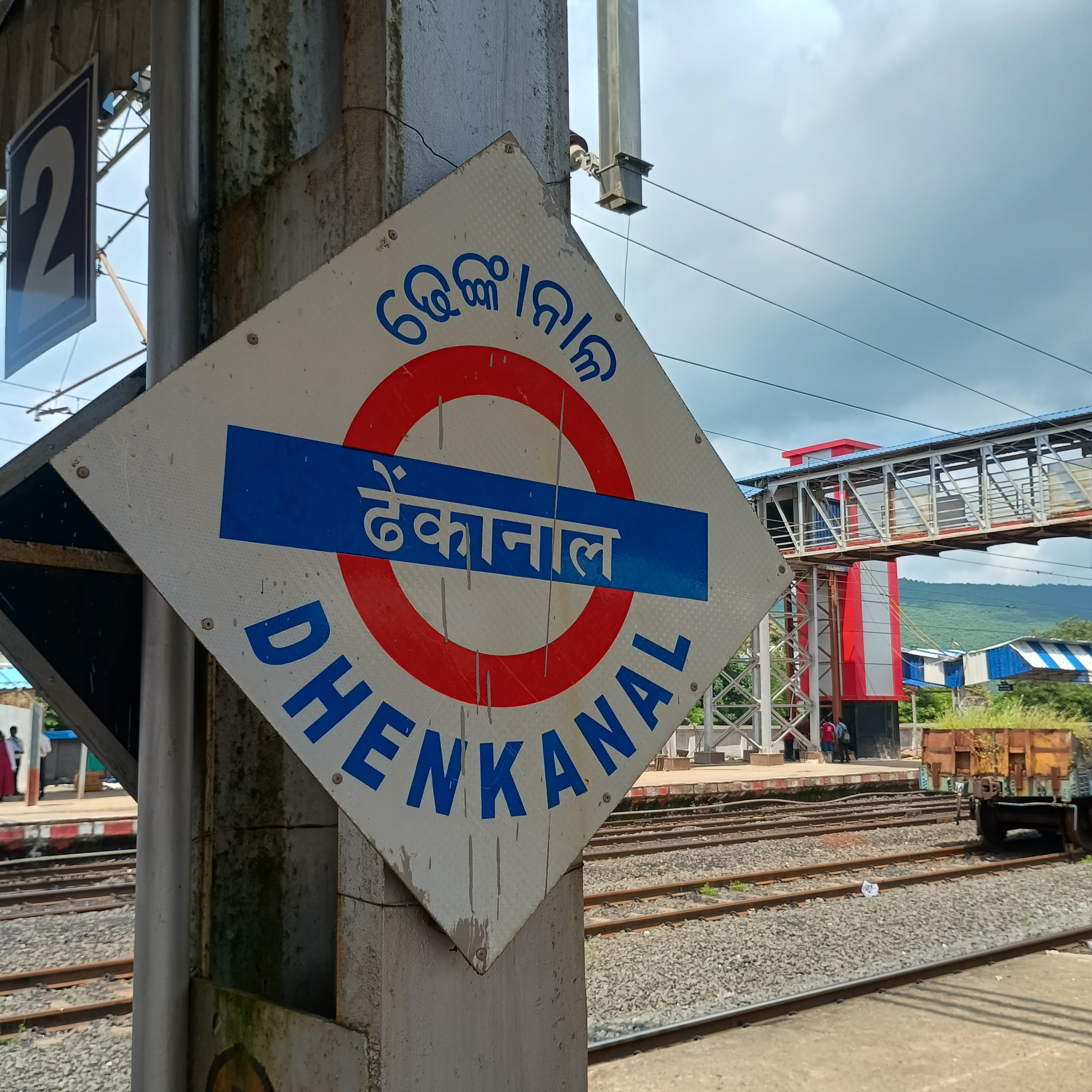
Dhenkanal Railway Station Board

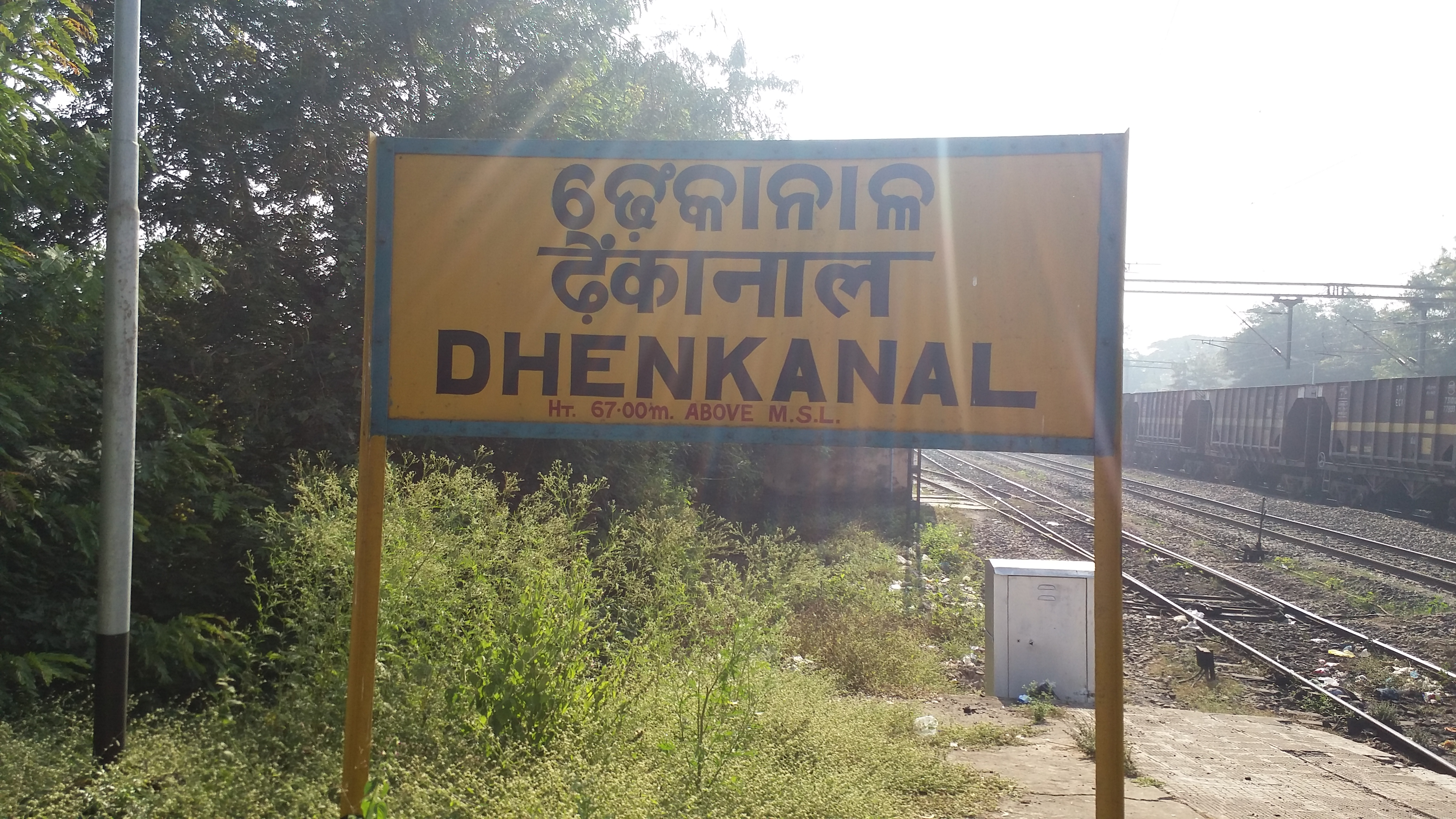
Dhenkanal railway station concrete board

== History ==
Dhenkanal railway station was developed in 1922 when Talcher coalfield was linked to Howrah–Chennai line. A double track was already present up to Talcher Town for facilitation of movement of coal. The Talcher–Sambalpur rail line was sanctioned in 1983. Construction of the Talcher–Sambalpur line began in 1987 and ended in 1996 and the line became operational in 1998.

== Services ==
The number of halting trains in Dhenkanal railway station is 60. It handles more than 2,000 passengers daily. It has direct trains to New Delhi, Mumbai, Howrah and also connects Western Odisha to the state capital Bhubaneswar.

The Dhenkanal railway station is on the Cuttack–Sambalpur section of East Coast railway line, which is a major route connecting Western Odisha to Coastal Odisha. It is directly connected to Mumbai, Delhi, Kolkata, Surat, Ranchi, Ahmedabad, Bhubaneswar, Nagpur, Bhopal, Vishakhapatnam, Amritsar, Raipur, Cuttack, Puri, Rourkela, and Sambalpur.
