= Talcher Road railway station =

Railway station in Odisha, India

Talcher Road

General information
- Location: Talcher, Odisha; India
- Coordinates: 20°53′N 85°12′E
- System: Indian Railways station
- Owner: East Coast Railway
- Line: Cuttack–Sambalpur line
- Platforms: 3
- Tracks: 4, 5 ft 6 in (1,676 mm) broad gauge

Construction
- Structure type: Standard (on-ground station)
- Parking: Available
- Accessible: Yes

Other information
- Status: Functioning
- Station code: TLHD
- Zone(s): East Coast Railway
- Division(s): Khurda Road

History
- Opened: 1992; 34 years ago

Passengers
- Daily: Above 3000
Location
- Location within Odisha Location within India

Talcher Road railway station is a railway station which is about 10 kilometres (6.2 mi) from Talcher. It is a satellite railway station of Talcher town. Talcher railway station is located in the city premises and is terminus railway station.

== History ==
Talcher road railway station developed during the expansion of industrial carriageway and corridor of NALCO Aluminium Plant, FCI and NTPC. A double track was already present up to Talcher Town for facilitation of movement of coal. The Talcher–Sambalpur rail line constituted in year 1987 ended its final works in 1996 became operational in 1998. The station came up in 1992 and henceforth gained a lot of importance.

== Services ==
Talcher road railway station has over 5000 passengers traffic daily and 42 trains UP/DOWN pass through the station. Talcher Puri Fast Passenger originates here.

It is situated on the Cuttack–Sambalpur line section of East Coast railway line which is a major route connecting Mumbai to Bhubaneswar of India. Talcher road is connected to Mumbai, Delhi, Kolkata, Surat, Pune, Ahmedabad, Bhubaneswar, Rourkela, Nagpur, Vishakhapatnam, Amritsar, Raipur, Cuttack, Puri, Sambalpur, Berhampur.

== Ongoing projects ==
- Talcher–Bimlagarh
- Talcher Road–Sambalpur rail tracks doubling.
