= Angul railway station =

Railway station in Odisha, India

Angul
- Indian Railways logo

General information
- Location: Angul, Odisha; India
- Coordinates: 20°50′N 85°06′E
- Elevation: 195 metres (640 ft)
- System: Indian Railways station
- Owner: Indian Railways
- Operator: East Coast Railway
- Line: Cuttack–Sambalpur line
- Platforms: 3
- Tracks: 6 5 ft 6 in (1,676 mm) broad gauge

Construction
- Structure type: Standard (on-ground station)
- Parking: Yes
- Accessible: Available

Other information
- Status: Functioning
- Station code: ANGL
- Zone(s): East Coast Railway zone
- Division(s): Khurda Road

History
- Opened: 1992; 34 years ago

Passengers
- Daily: Above 3000
Location
- Location within Odisha Location within India

Angul railway station (station code:- ANGL) is a railway station which is about 6 kilometres (3.7 mi) from Angul. Satellite stations is Talcher road. Angul railway station has an electric loco shed of East Coast Railway.

== History ==
Angul railway station developed during the expansion of industrial carriageway and corridor of NALCO Aluminium Plant, FCI and NTPC. A double track was already present up to Talcher Town for facilitation of movement of coal. The Talcher–Sambalpur rail line constituted in year 1987 ended its final works in 1996 became operational in 1998. The station came up in 1992 and henceforth gained a lot of importance. An electric loco shed of East Coast Railway was opened in 2005.

== Services ==
Angul railway station has over 5000 passengers traffic daily and more than 10 trains UP/DOWN pass through the station. Angul Puri Fast Passenger originates here.

It is situated on the Barang Sambalpur section of East Coast railway line which is a major route connecting Mumbai to Bhubaneswar of India. Angul is connected to Mumbai, Delhi, Kolkata, Surat, Pune, Ahmedabad, Bhubaneswar, Nagpur, Vishakhapatnam, Amritsar, Raipur, Cuttack, Puri, Sambalpur.

== Electric Loco Shed ==
Angul Loco Shed was developed in 2005 and presently holding 236 WAG-7 locomotives only. Initially Diesel Loco Shed (DLS) was commissioned in Angul in 1999. In 2002 Indian railways decided to convert DLS to ELS for homing capacity of 50 locos. In 2005 Angul DLS/ELS 50 locos was converted to Electric Loco Shed Angul. Augmentation work from 105 locos to 150 locos is under progress.

== Ongoing projects ==
- Angul–Sukinda rail tracks
- Talcher–Bimlagarh
- Talcher Road–Sambalpur rail tracks doubling.
