= Sambalpur railway division =

Railway division of India

- Location in Odisha View of Sambalpur railway division in Odisha map

Overview
- Headquarters: Sambalpur
- Locale: Odisha, India
- Dates of operation: 1951; 74 years ago–present
- Predecessor: East Coast Railway

Other
- Website: East Coast Railways website

Sambalpur railway division is one of the three railway divisions under the jurisdiction of East Coast Railway Zone of the Indian Railways. This railway division was formed on 5 November 1951 and its headquarter is located at Sambalpur in the state of Odisha of India.

Waltair railway division and Khurda Road railway division are the other two railway divisions under ECoR Zone headquartered at Bhubaneshwar.

== List of railway stations and towns ==
The list includes the stations under the Sambalpur railway division and their station category.

| Category of station | No. of stations | Names of stations |
|---|---|---|
| A-1 | 0 | |
| A | 1 | Sambalpur |
| B | - | - |
| C suburban station | - | - |
| D | - | - |
| E | - | - |
| F halt station | - | - |
| Total | - | - |

Stations closed for Passengers -
