= Cuttack–Sambalpur line =

Railway line in India

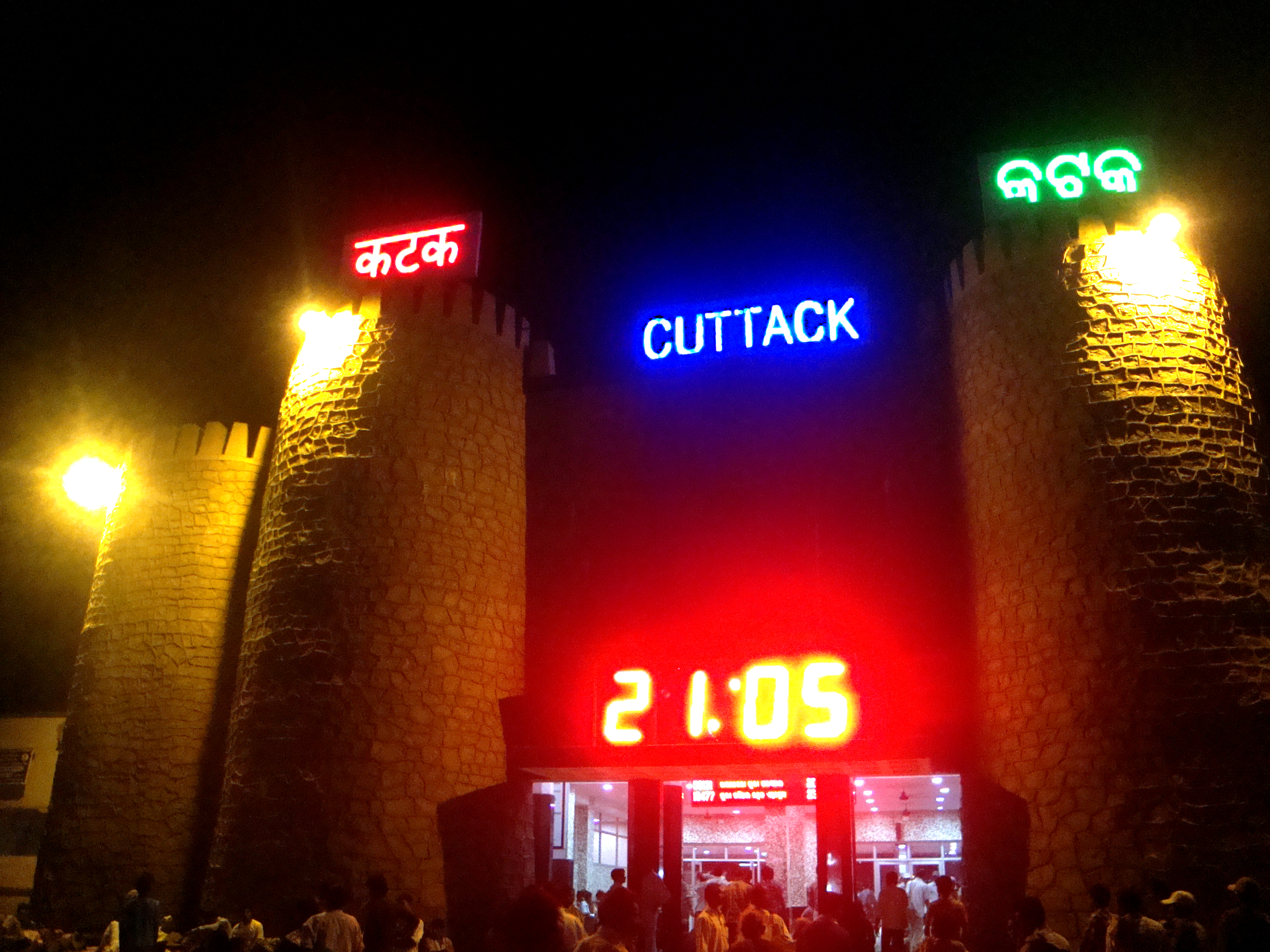
- Cuttack railway station the starting point of Cuttack–Sambalpur line

Overview
- Status: Operational
- Owner: Indian Railways
- Locale: Odisha
- Termini: Cuttack; Sambalpur

Service
- Operator: East Coast Railway

History
- Opened: 1998

Technical
- Track length: 284 km (176 mi)
- Number of tracks: 2
- Track gauge: 5 ft 6 in (1,676 mm) broad gauge
- Electrification: Yes (since 2018)
- Operating speed: up to 100 km/h (62 mph)

The Cuttack–Sambalpur line is a railway line connecting the cities of Cuttack with the Sambalpur, in the Indian state of Odisha.

== Geography ==
The Cuttack–Sambalpur line traverses the center of Odisha running along the river Mahanadi. Its route connects four districts of Odisha: Cuttack, Dhenkanal, Angul and Sambalpur. It connects the Mahanadi Coalfields in Talcher and Nalco in Angul to Howrah–Chennai main line in the east and Jharsuguda–Vizianagaram line in the west. It also connects Mahanadi Coalfields in Western Odisha to Talcher.

== History ==
In 1922, a railway line was built from Talcher to Nergundi to connect the coalfields in Talcher to the Howrah-Chennai main line. But since there was a need to connect the coalfields of Western Odisha to Eastern Odisha, the Talcher–Sambalpur railway project was commissioned in 1983 and the work began in 1987. It was completed in 1996 and became operational in 1998. The flagging off of the Tapaswini Express, the first passenger train of the section by the Hon'ble Minister of Railways, fulfilled the long cherished dream of the people of Odisha to have a cultural, emotional, and socio-economic integration of the eastern and western parts of the State. This rail link, apart from relieving congestion of the Howrah–Mumbai and Howrah–Chennai trunk routes, reduced the distance between Cuttack, Bhubaneswar, and Puri, respectively the commercial, political, and cultural capitals of Odisha, to important Indian cities of Western and Northern India such as Mumbai, New Delhi, etc. by 380 km.

== Electrification and track doubling ==
The track doubling and the electrification of the Cuttack–Talcher section were completed in 2015. The electrification of Talcher–Sambalpur section was completed in 2018. The track doubling work of Talcher-Sambalpur was completed in 2023, thus completing the track doubling and electrification of the entire Cuttack-Sambalpur route.

== NALCO and NTPC links ==
This railway line connects NALCO and NTPC plants in Angul to rest of the country. The plant receives coal from the Lingaraj coal mine of MCL through a MGR Railway transportation system covering a distance of 39 km.

== Coalfield links ==
Talcher Coalfield with reserves of 38.65 billion tonnes, the largest in India, is located on the Cuttack–Sambalpur line. This railway line connects the MCL coalfields of Brajrajnagar and Talcher in western and eastern Odisha respectively.

== Speed limits ==
The Cuttack–Sambalpur line is classified as a "Group D Spl" line which can take speeds up to 100 km/h. This section carries high traffic density. The sanctioned speed limit for this line is 100 km/h.

== Passenger movement ==
Cuttack, Dhenkanal, Angul, Talcher road and Sambalpur are the busiest railway stations in this section.
