= East Coast Railway zone =

Railway zone in India

East Coast Railway

Overview
- Headquarters: Bhubaneswar
- Reporting mark: ECoR
- Locale: Odisha; Chhattisgarh; Andhra Pradesh
- Dates of operation: 3 April 2003; 23 years ago–
- Predecessor: South Eastern Railway Zone

Technical
- Track gauge: 5 ft 6 in (1,676 mm)
- Electrification: 25 kV 50 Hz AC

Other
- Website: eastcoastrail.indianrailways.gov.in

The East Coast Railway (abbreviated ECoR) is one of the 19 railway zones of Indian Railways. It came into existence on 3 April 2003. It headquarters are located at Bhubaneswar.

== History ==
Consequent upon the parliament's approval, East Coast Railway was the first of the seven new zones to be inaugurated by the then Prime Minister of India H. D. Deve Gowda on 8 August 1996. The Officer-on-Special Duty took charge of the newly declared Zone on 16 September 1996. Initially, only one division namely Khurda Road was attached to this railway.

The zone became fully operational on 3 April 2003. The Waltair division was notified to be bifurcated from the East Coast Railway zone on 27 February 2019. The Odisha section of Waltair division will constitute the new Rayagada division, while the Andhra Pradesh section will be a part of the South Coast Railway zone upon operationalization.

== Divisions ==
The geographical jurisdiction of East Coast Railway zone extends over three states encompassing almost all of Odisha and Bastar, Mahasamund and Dantewada districts of Chhattisgarh and The zonal headquarters is at Bhubaneswar in Odisha.

The zone has three divisions: Sambalpur, Khurda and Rayagada.

The Rayagada railway division was proposed to succeed a section of the former Waltair division which will remain in the East Coast Railway zone upon bifurcation. The foundation stone for the zone was laid on 6 January 2025, with the demarcation of the zone finalised on 7 February 2025.

== Gallery ==
East Coast Railway Gallery
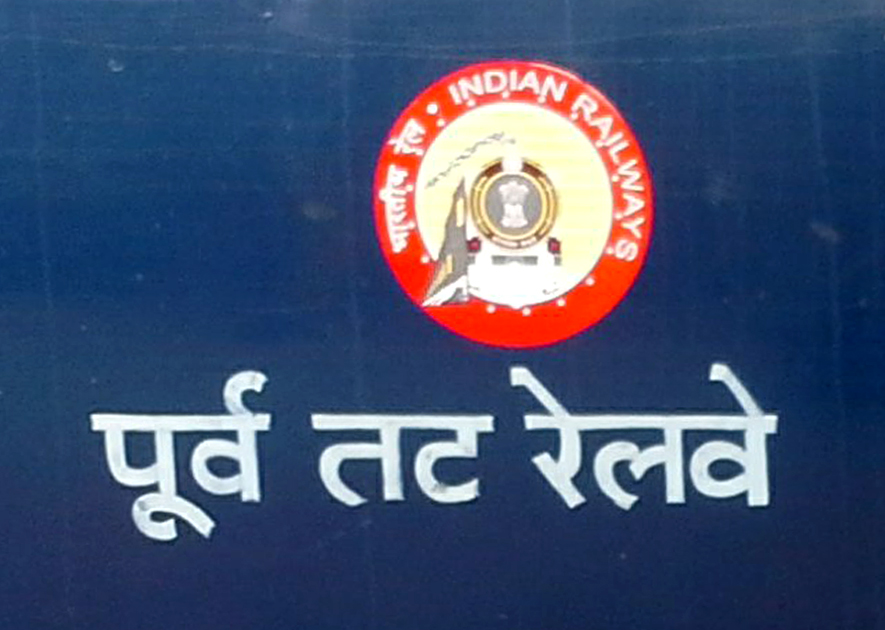
East Coast Railway written in Devanagari

== Rail infrastructure ==
- Carriage Repair Workshop – Mancheswar, Bhubaneswar
- MEMU Shed – Khurda Road

== Routes ==
East Coast Railway zone has about 273 railway stations with a track length of 5214 km spread as follows:-

Division	Total kilometre		Electrified kilometre	
Division	Track	Route	Track	Route
Total	5,214	2,677	3,371	1,543

== Railway lines ==
ECoR zone has below tracks. All are 5 ft 6 in (1,676 mm) broad gauge. The sections are:-

1. Bhadrak-Bhubaneswar-Khurda Road- Double Electrified BG line [92 Railway stations]
2. Talcher-Cuttack Double Electrified BG line [21 Railway stations]
3. Titlagarh Junction-Mahasamund Double Electrified BG line [15 Railway stations]
4. Cuttack-Paradip Double Electrified BG line [10 Railway stations]
5. Khurda road-Puri Double Electrified BG line [11 Railway stations]
6. Sambalpur Junction-Talcher Double Electrified BG line [16 Railway stations]
7. Titlagarh Junction-Sambalpur Junction Double Electrified BG line [16 Railway stations]
8. Sambalpur Junction-Jharsuguda Junction Double Electrified BG line [10 Railway stations]
9. Rayagada-Koraput Single Electric BG line [15 Railway stations] (Electric doubling of this line is currently underway)
10. Naupada Junction-Gunupur Single Electrified line [14 Railway stations]
11. Jakhapura Junction-Banspani Double Electrified BG line [17 Railway stations]

== Loco sheds ==
- Electric Loco Shed, Angul

== Punctuality issues ==
ECoR zone is frequently among the poorly performing railway zones in terms of punctuality for mail / express trains. For instance, from data available in the media in 2023, in the week from May 15 and May 21 it was 64.4% , compared to 73.91% for Indian Railways and over 80% for the top four zones for that period. Similarly, the punctuality rate in the following week between May 22 and May 28 was 67.08%.

== See also ==
- All India Station Masters' Association (AISMA)
- Zones and divisions of Indian Railways
- South Coast Railway
