= Kalupara Ghat railway station =

Railway station in Odisha

Kalupara Ghat
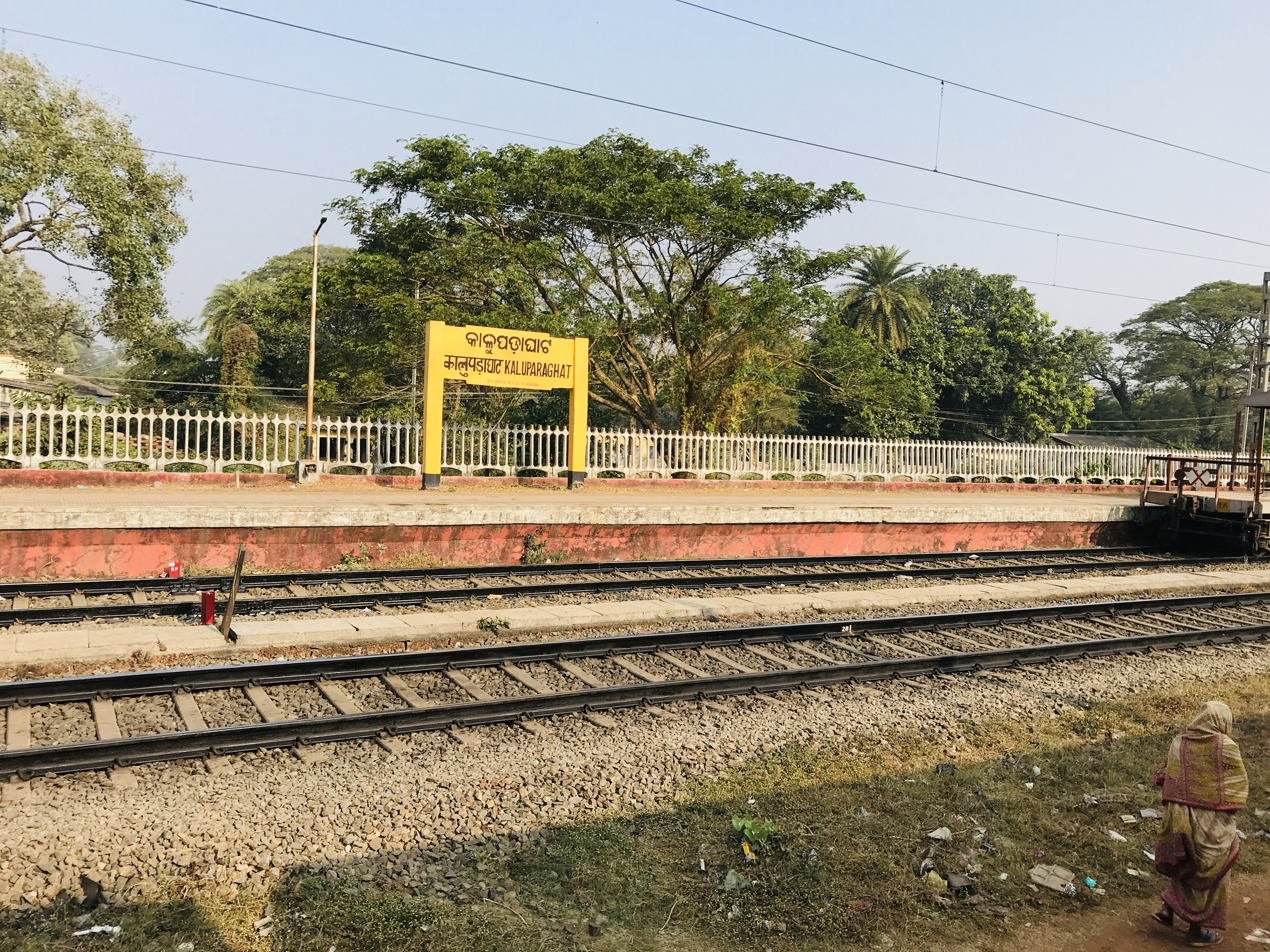
- Station freight docking platform

General information
- Location: Kalakaleswar, Odisha; India
- Coordinates: 19°53′47″N 85°24′11″E
- Elevation: 10 metres (33 ft)
- System: Indian Railways station
- Owner: Ministry of Railways, Indian Railways
- Line: Howrah–Chennai main line
- Platforms: 3
- Tracks: 4

Construction
- Structure type: Standard (on ground)
- Parking: No

Other information
- Status: Functioning
- Station code: KAPG
- Zone(s): East Coast Railway
- Division(s): Khurda Road
Location
- Location within India Location within Odisha

Kalupara Ghat railway station is a railway station on the East Coast Railway network in the state of Odisha, India. It serves Kalakaleswar village. Its code is KAPG. It has three platforms. Passenger, MEMU, Express and Superfast trains halt at Kalupara Ghat railway station.

== Major trains ==
- East Coast Express
- Hirakhand Express
- Bhubaneshwar-Visakhapatnam Intercity Express
- Puri–Tirupati Express
- Puri–Gunupur Express
- Puri–Ahmedabad Express
- Prashanti Express
- Rourkela–Gunupur Rajyarani Express
- Gandhidham–Puri Weekly Express(22973 only)

== See also ==
- Khordha district

== Gallery ==
Kalupara Ghat railway station

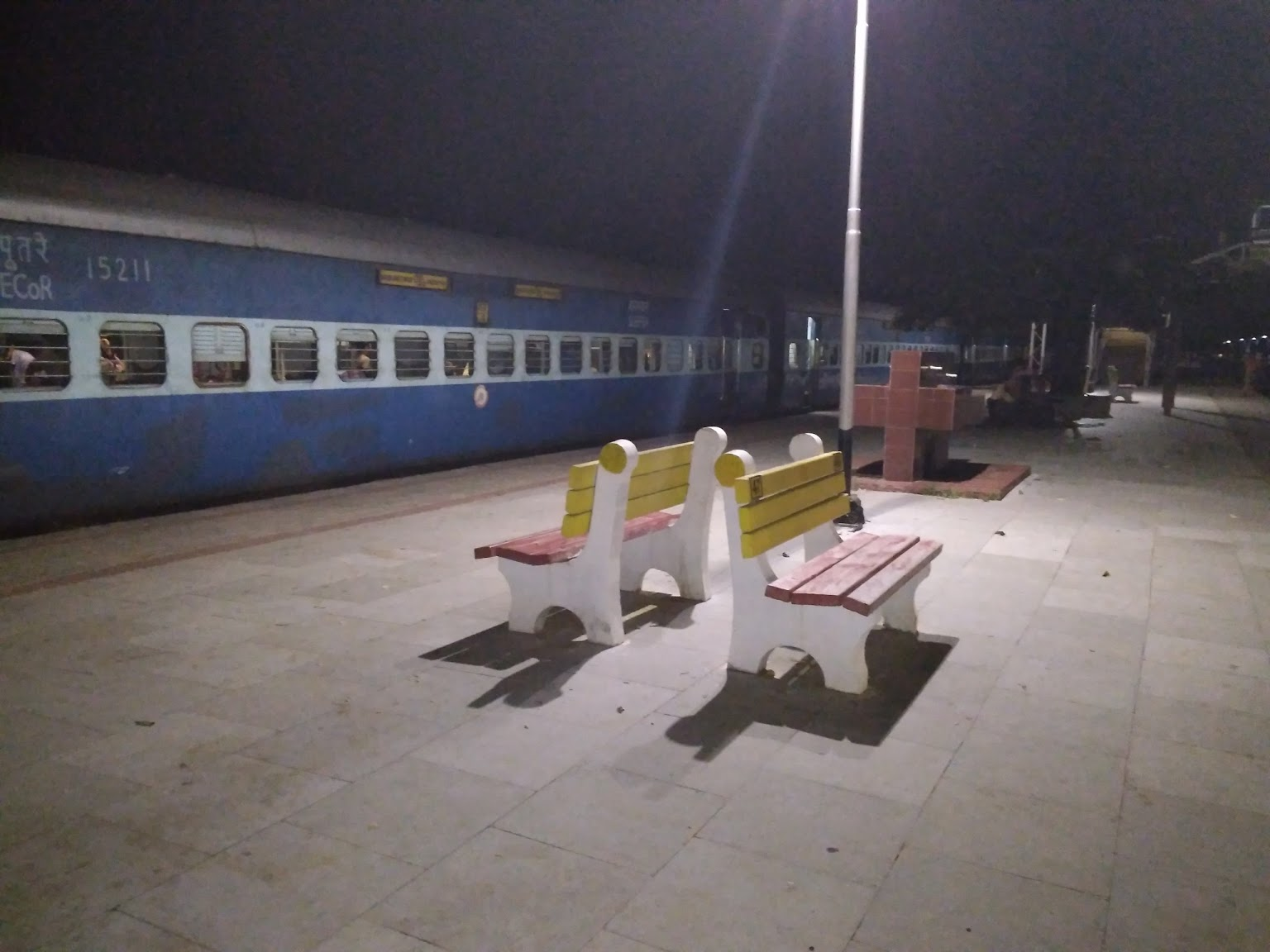
Kalupara Ghat railway station

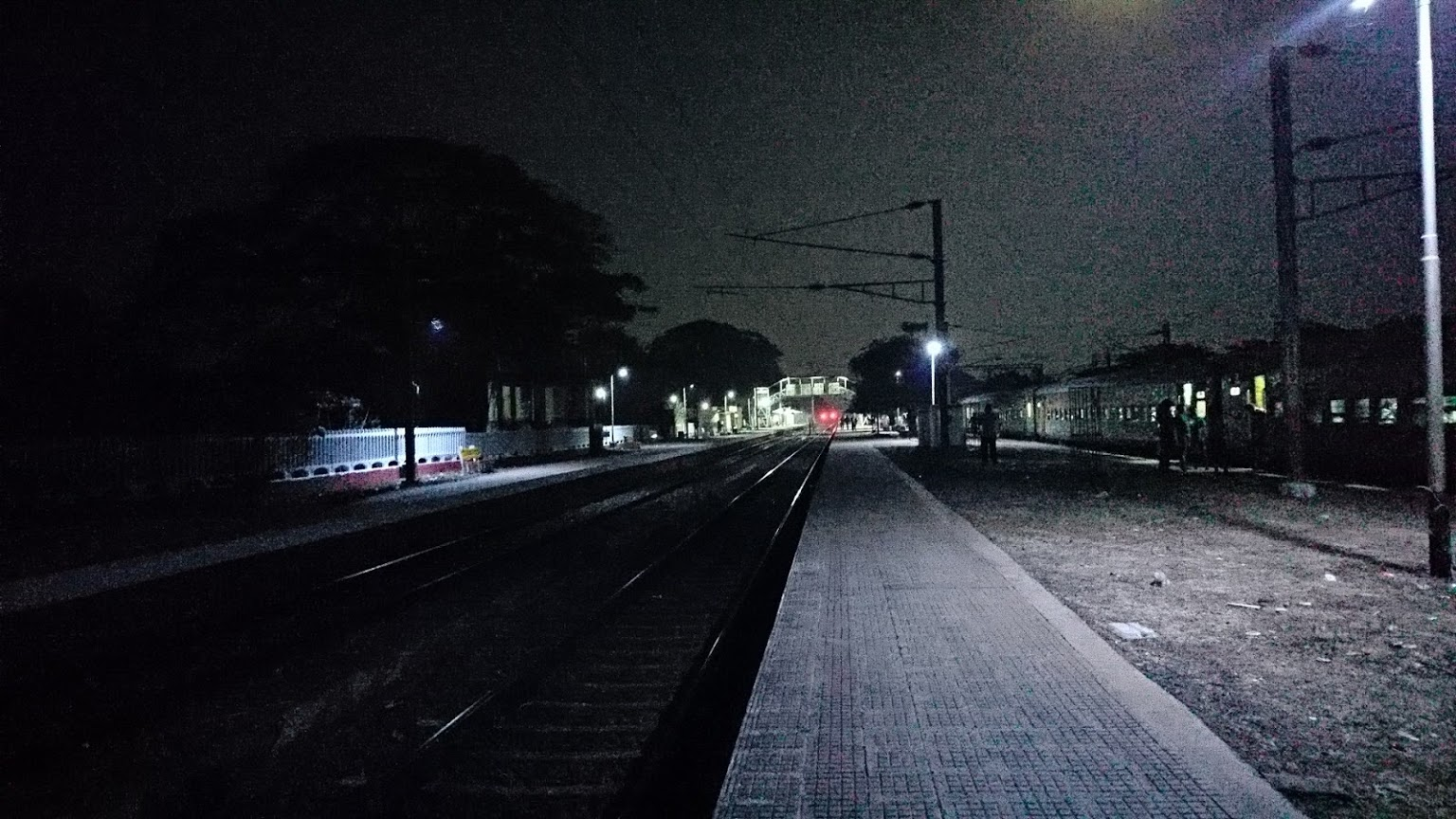
Kalupara Ghat railway station

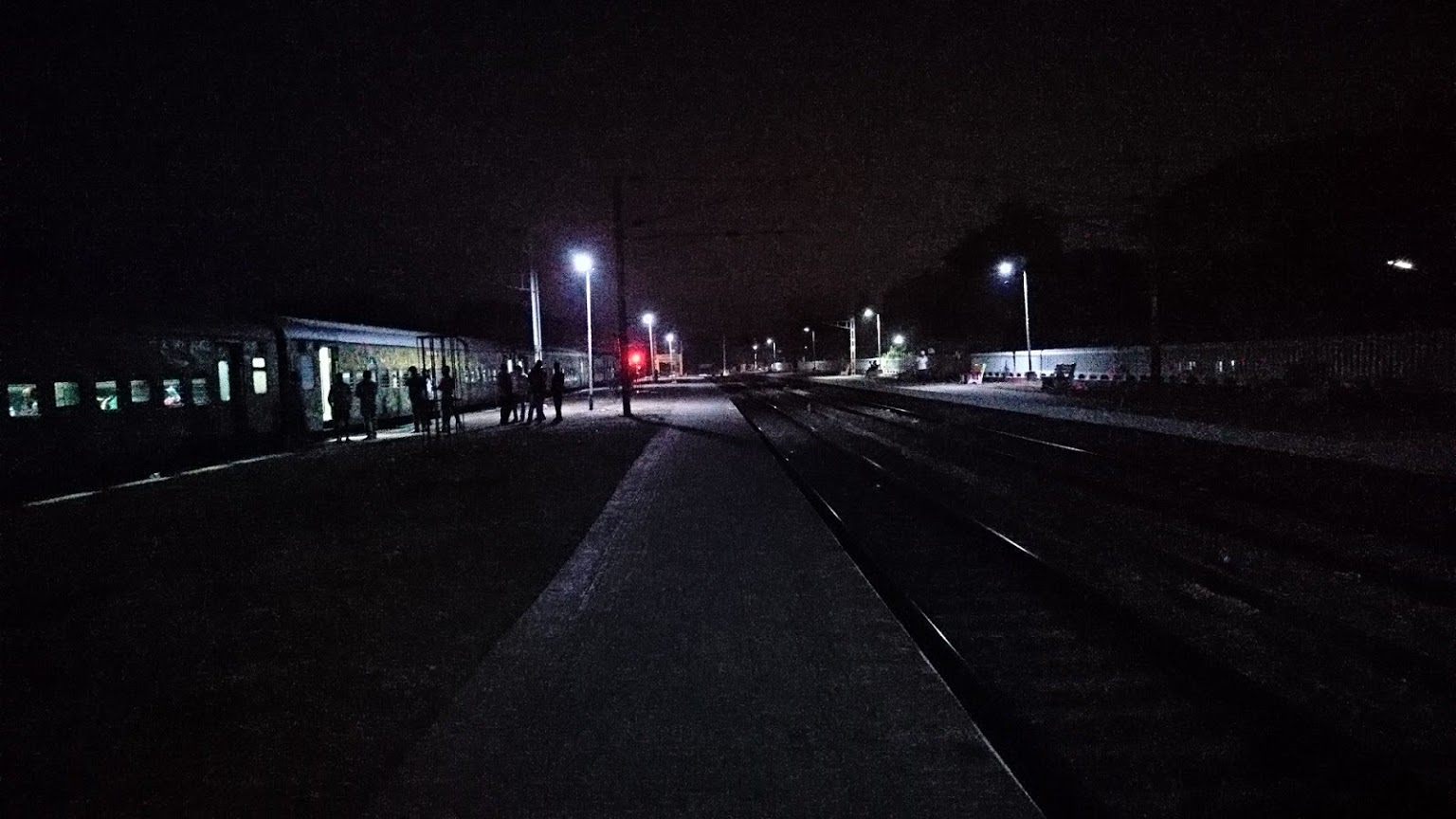
Kalupara Ghat railway station

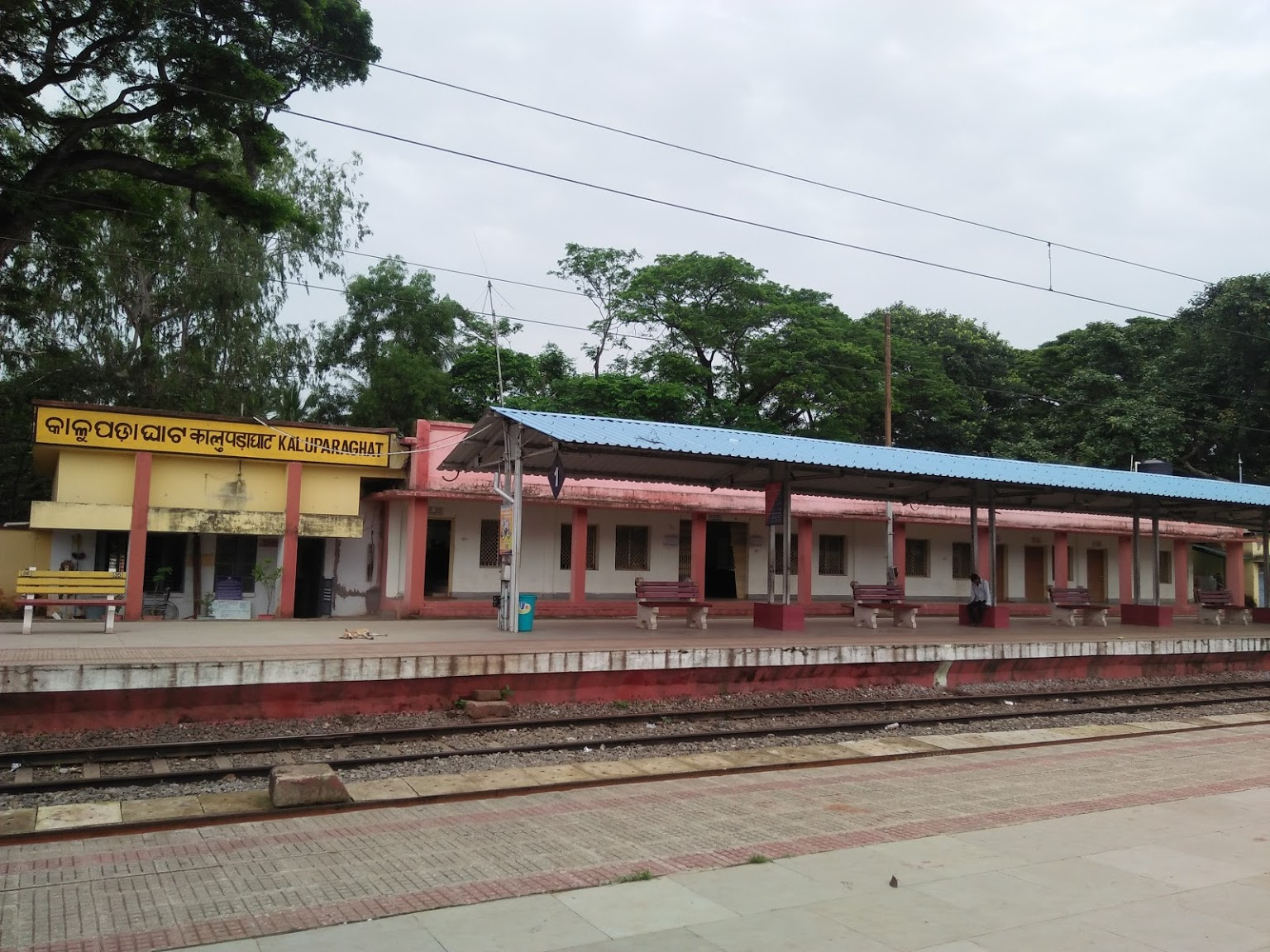
Kalupara Ghat railway station

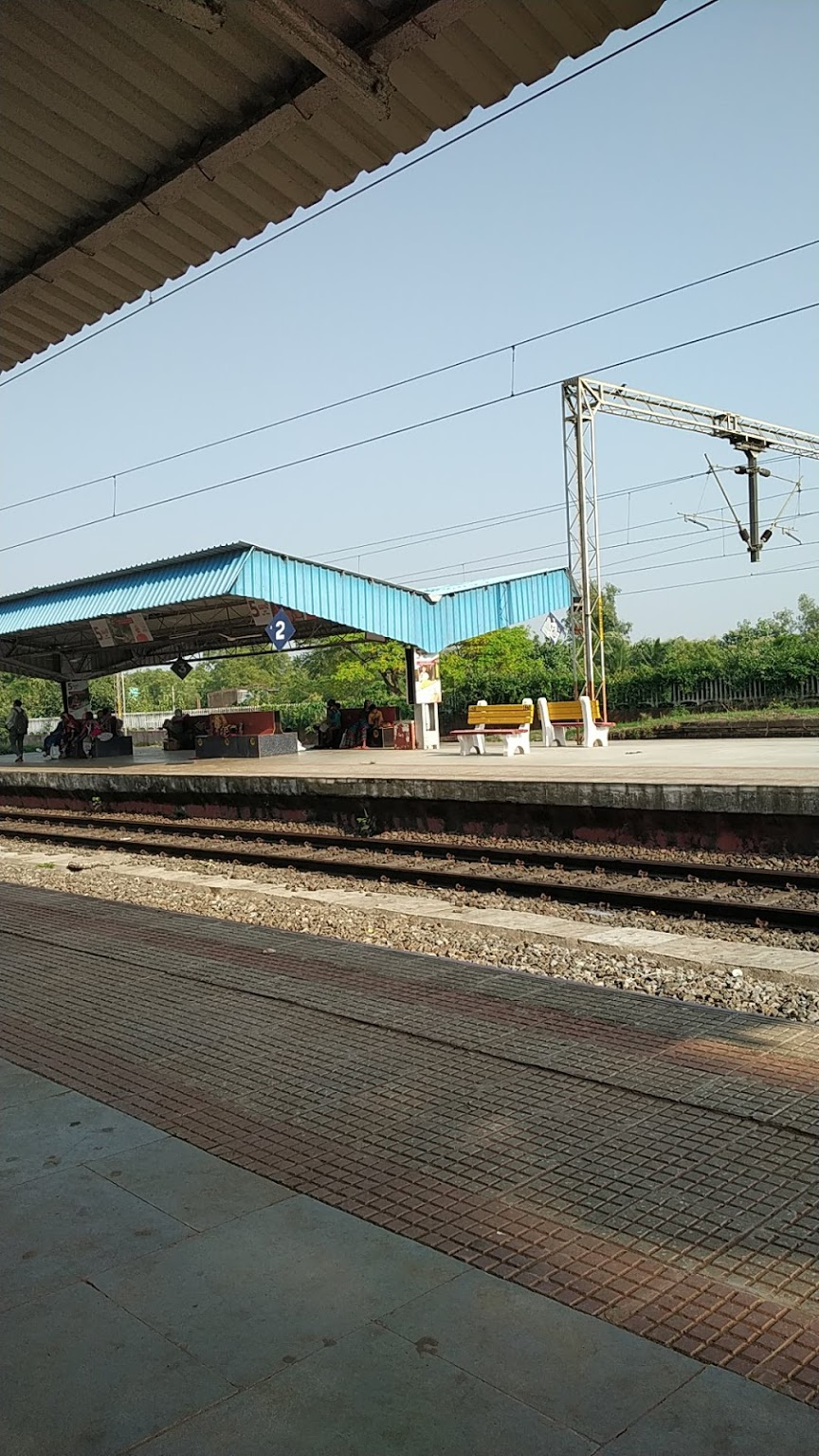
Kalupara Ghat railway station
