= Dhanmandal railway station =

Railway station in Odisha

Dhanmandal

General information
- Location: Dhanmandal, Odisha; India
- Coordinates: 20°41′12″N 86°06′42″E
- System: Indian Railways station
- Owner: Ministry of Railways, Indian Railways
- Line: Howrah–Chennai main line
- Platforms: 3
- Tracks: 3

Construction
- Structure type: Standard (on ground)
- Parking: No

Other information
- Status: Functioning
- Station code: DNM
- Zone(s): East Coast Railway
- Division(s): Khurda Road
Location
- Location within India Location within Odisha

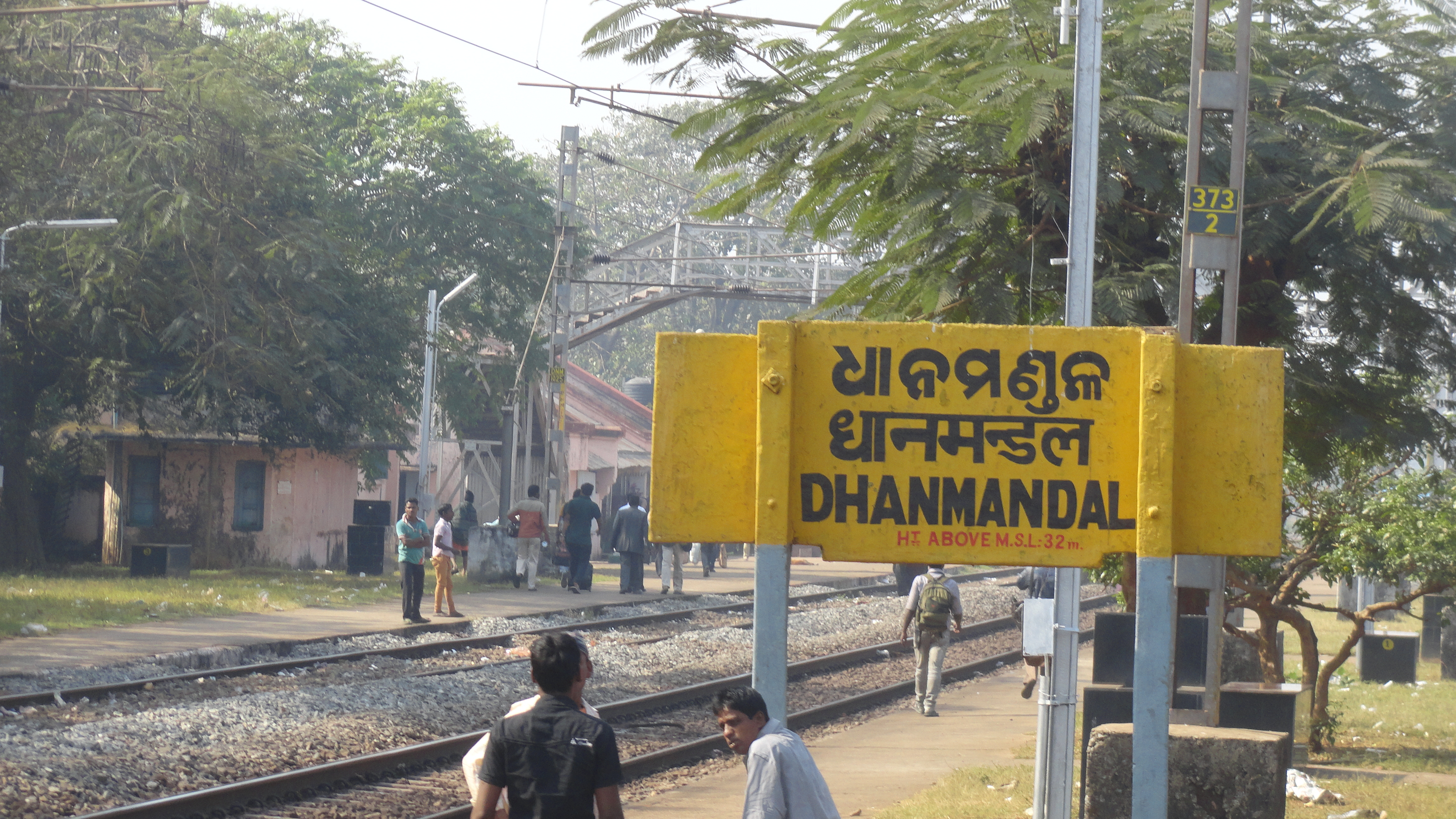

Dhanmandal railway station is a railway station on the East Coast Railway network in the state of Odisha, India. It serves Dhanmandal village. Its code is DNM. It has three platforms. Passenger, MEMU, Express trains halt at Dhanmandal railway station.

== Major trains ==
- East Coast Express
- Dhauli Express
- Neelachal Express

== See also ==
- Jajpur district
