= Khallikot =

Town in Odisha, India

Khallikot Khallikote
- Town
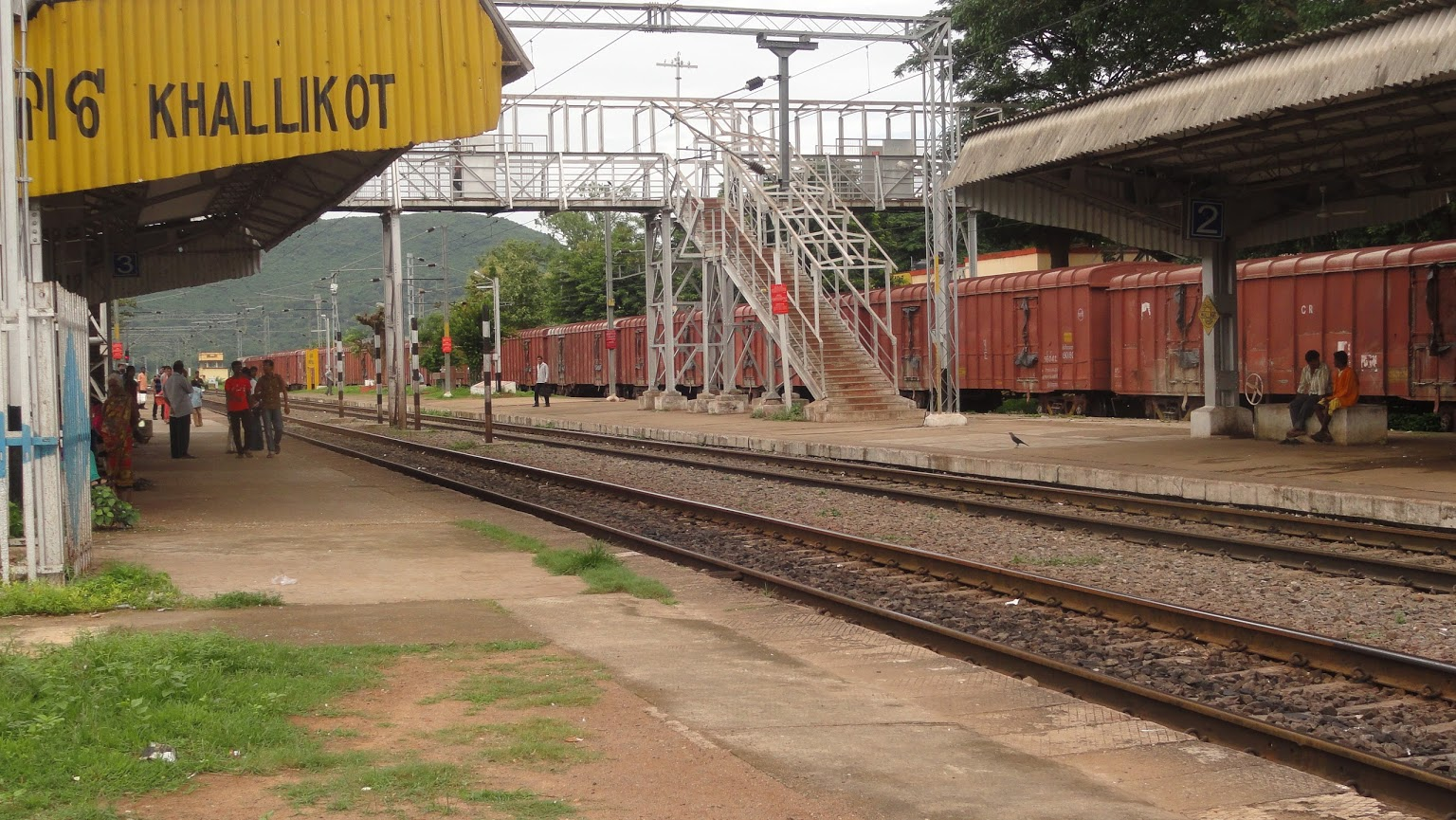
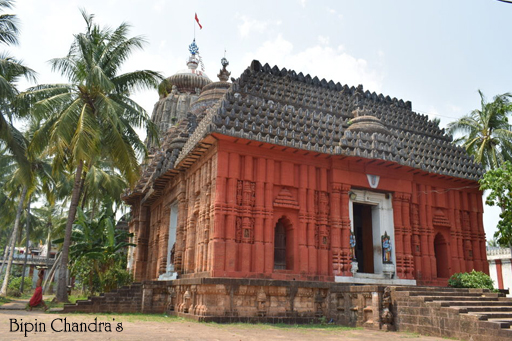
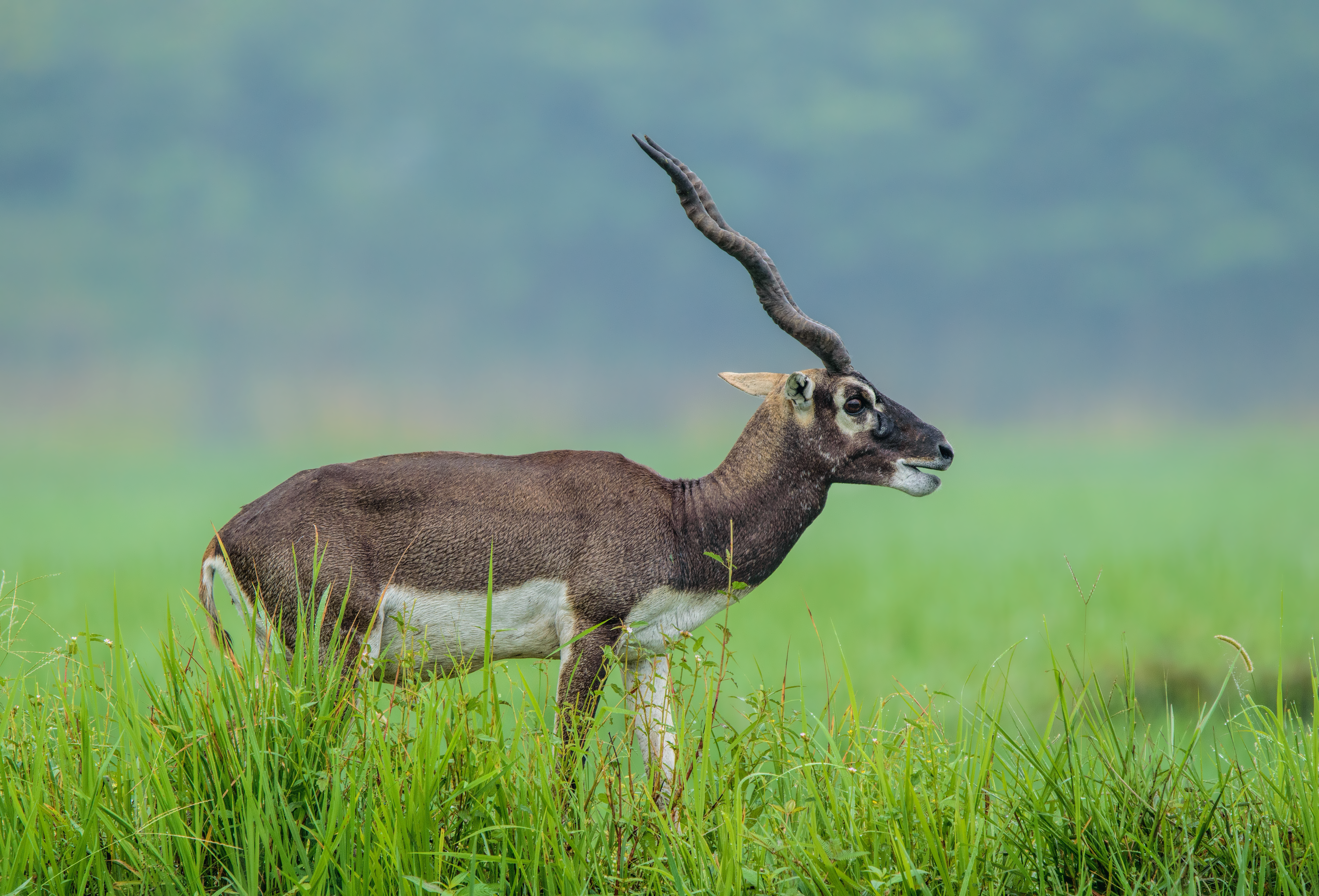
- From top; left to right: Khallikot railway station, Jagannath Mandir & A male Black Buck at Talaramapalli village of Khallikot

- Location in Odisha Location in India
- Coordinates: 19.62°N 85.08°E
- Country: India
- State: Odisha
- District: Ganjam
- Elevation: 54 m (177 ft)

Population (2011)
  - Total: 13,022

Languages
  - Official: Odia
- Time zone: UTC+5:30 (IST)
- PIN: 761030
- Telephone code: 06810
- Vehicle registration: OR-07/OD-07

Khallikot is a town and a Notified Area Council in Ganjam district in the Indian state of Odisha.

== Geography ==
Khallikot is located at 19.62°N 85.08°E. It has an average elevation of 54 m (177 ft).

== Demographics ==
As of 2001 India census, Khallikot had a population of 10,959. Males constitute 52% of the population and females 48%. Khallikot has an average literacy rate of 67%, higher than the national average of 59.5%: male literacy is 77%, and female literacy is 55%. In Khallikot, 12% of the population is under 6 years of age.

Religion in Khallikot
Hinduism	99.09%
Islam	0.74%
Christianity	0.05%
Sikh	0.02%
Buddhist	0.01%
Jain	0.00%
Not Stated	0.09%
Other	0.00%

== Politics ==
Current MLA from Khalikote Assembly constituency is Purna Chandra Sethi who won the seat in State election in 2024 from BJP.

Prior to him V.Sugyani Kumari Deo of BJD, who won the seat in State elections in 2004 and also in 2000, in 1995 representing JD, in 1990 representing JD, in 1985 representing JNP and in 1977 representing JNP. Trinath Samantary of INC(I) was MLA from this seat in 1980.

Khallikote is part of Aska (Lok Sabha constituency).

== Climate and regional setting ==
Maximum summer temperature is 37 °C; minimum winter temperature is 16 °C. The mean daily temperature varies from 33 °C to 38 °C. May is the hottest month; December is the coldest. The average annual rainfall is 1250 mm and the region receives monsoon and torrential rainfall from July to October.

Climate data for Khallikote, Odisha
Month	Jan	Feb	Mar	Apr	May	Jun	Jul	Aug	Sep	Oct	Nov	Dec	Year
Mean daily maximum °C (°F)	27 (81)	30 (86)	34 (93)	36 (97)	37 (99)	34 (93)	32 (90)	31 (88)	32 (90)	32 (90)	30 (86)	28 (82)	32 (90)
Mean daily minimum °C (°F)	16 (61)	19 (66)	23 (73)	27 (81)	29 (84)	28 (82)	27 (81)	27 (81)	26 (79)	23 (73)	20 (68)	16 (61)	23 (74)
Average rainfall mm (inches)	12.40 (0.49)	17.40 (0.69)	18.60 (0.73)	15.00 (0.59)	40.30 (1.59)	150.00 (5.91)	282.10 (11.11)	272.80 (10.74)	180.00 (7.09)	93.00 (3.66)	33.00 (1.30)	18.60 (0.73)	1,133.2 (44.63)
Source: MSM Weather
