= Upendranath College =

College in Odisha, India

Coordinates: 21.283335°N 86.674945°E

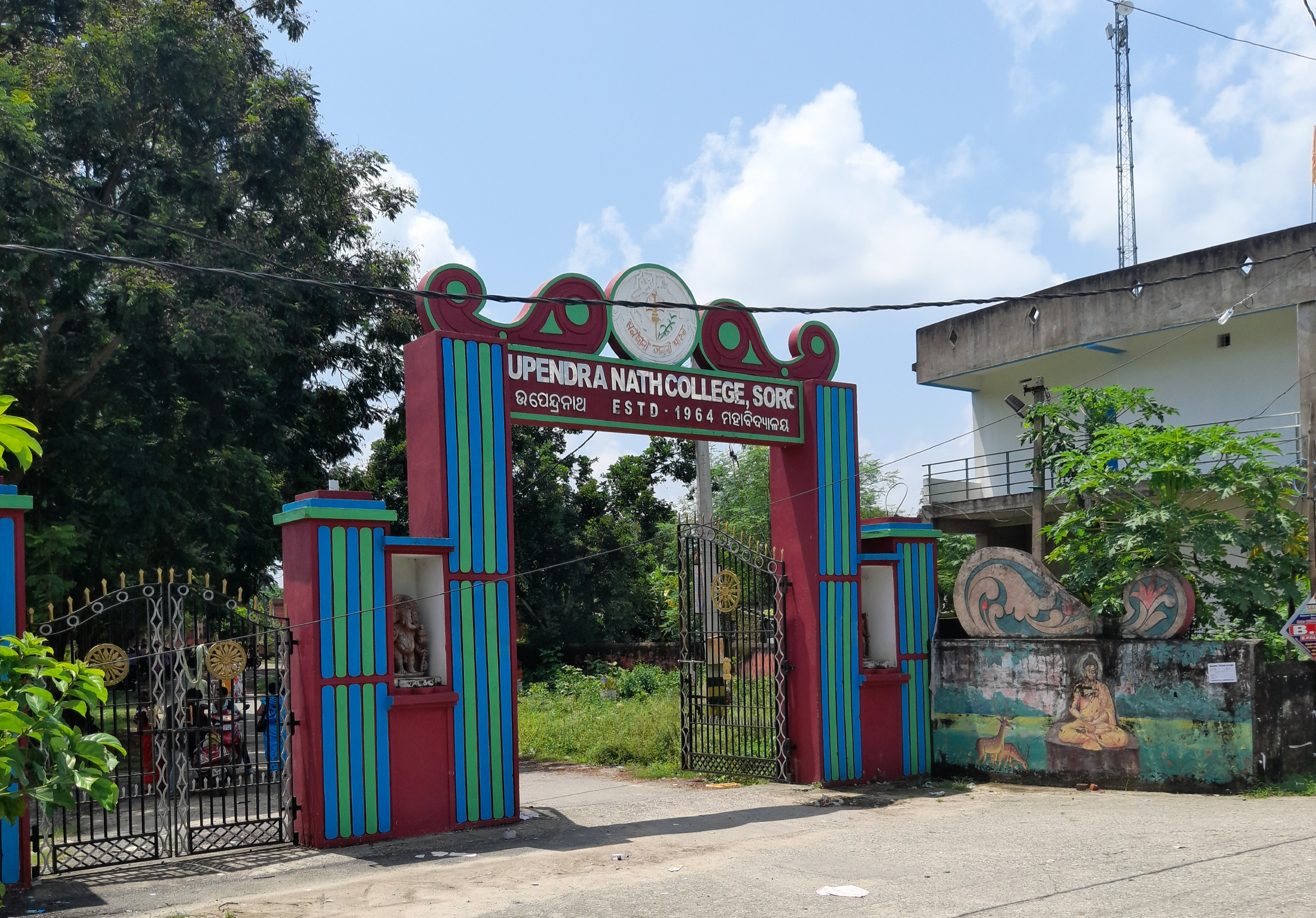
Upendranath College, Soro

Upendranath College is located in Soro, Balasore district, Odisha, India. The college was founded in 1964. It is located near NH-16. The Higher Secondary courses are affiliated to Council of Higher Secondary Education, Odisha and Graduation courses are affiliated to Fakir Mohan University. Arts Degree started in 1966, Commerce in 1978 and Science in 1980.

== Notable alumni ==
- Dipanwit Dashmohapatra — Indian actor
