= Prashanti Express =

Train in India

Overview
- Service type: Express
- Locale: Odisha, Andhra Pradesh & Karnataka
- First service: 22 November 1998; 27 years ago
- Current operator: East Coast Railway

Route
- Termini: Bhubaneswar (BBS); KSR Bengaluru (SBC)
- Stops: 43
- Distance travelled: 1,547 km (961 mi)
- Average journey time: 30 hrs 35 mins
- Service frequency: Daily
- Train number: 18463 / 18464

On-board services
- Classes: AC 1 Tier , AC 2 Tier, AC 3 Tier, Sleeper Class, General Unreserved
- Seating arrangements: Yes
- Sleeping arrangements: Yes
- Catering facilities: Available
- Observation facilities: Large windows
- Baggage facilities: Available
- Other facilities: Below the seats

Technical
- Rolling stock: LHB coach
- Track gauge: 1,676 mm (5 ft 6 in)
- Operating speed: 52 km/h (32 mph) average including halts.
Route map
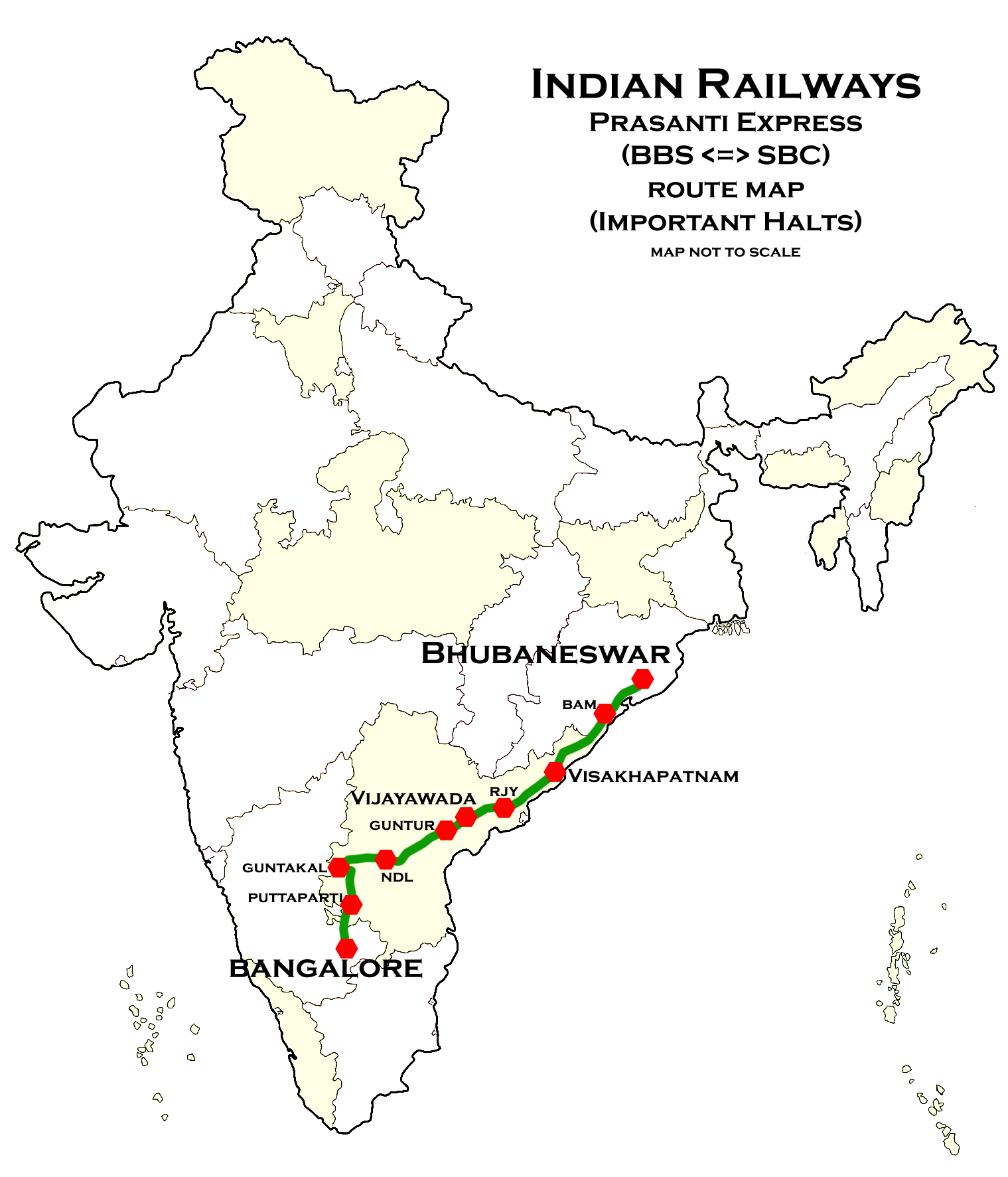

The 18463 / 18464 Prashanti Express is a daily train that runs between Bhubaneswar and KSR Bengaluru which used to run between Visakhapatnam and KSR Bengaluru previously. It leaves Bhubaneswar railway station at 05:40 a.m and reaches KSR Bengaluru the next day at 11:45 a.m. The duration of journey is approximately 30 hours. It operates as train number 18463 from Bhubaneswar to KSR Bengaluru and as train number 18464 between KSR Bengaluru and Bhubaneswar. Its previous number was 18563 and 18564.

This train belongs to East Coast Railway zone of Indian Railways, having primary maintenance at Bhubaneswar.

This is the best train to travel from Bhubaneswar to Visakhapatnam, Rajahmundry, Vijayawada and Guntakal due to its cleanliness, punctuality and superfast speed.

However, when it enters SWR Zone (South Western Railway zone), it is being delayed, particularly in Bengaluru suburbs.

== History ==
Before 1997/98, the train was a prestigious Meter Gauge era service between Vijayawada & Bangalore. After gauge conversion, the train was re-introduced on 22 November 1998 between Visakhapatnam and Bangalore. It was extended to Bhubaneswar on 20 February 2008 and since then it has been running between Bhubaneswar and Bangalore.

== Route and halts ==
1. Bhubaneswar
2. Khurda Road Junction
3. Nirakarpur
4. Kalupara Ghat
5. Balugaon
6. Khallikot
7. Chatrapur
8. Brahmapur
9. Ichchapuram
10. Sompeta
11. Palasa
12. Naupada Junction
13. Srikakulam Road
14. Chipurupalle
15. Vizianagaram Junction
16. Visakhapatnam Junction
17. Duvvada
18. Anakapalle
19. Tuni
20. Annavaram
21. Samalkot Junction
22. Rajahmundry
23. Nidadavolu Junction
24. Tadepalligudem
25. Eluru
26. Vijayawada Junction
27. Guntur Junction
28. Narasaraopet
29. Vinukonda
30. Markapur Road
31. Cumbum
32. Giddalur
33. Nandyal
34. Dhone Junction
35. Guntakal Junction
36. Gooty Junction
37. Anantapur
38. Dharmavaram Junction
39. Sathya Sai Prasanthi Nilayam
40. Penukonda Junction
41. Hindupur
42. Gowribidanur
43. Yelahanka Junction
44. Bangalore East
45. Bangalore Cantonment
46. KSR Bengaluru City

== Traction and reversal ==
The train uses WAP-4 and WAP-7 of Vishakapatnam shed between Bhubaneswar and Vishakapatnam.

At Visakhapatnam, loco reversal is done and a LGD (Lalaguda) or a BZA(Vijayawada) based WAP-7 takes it till end of journey till Bengaluru City.

== Coach composition ==
As of 22 June 2023 it has 1 First AC, 2 2AC, 7 3AC, 1 pantry car, 6 Sleeper, 2 General and 2 SLR (EOG cum luggage) coaches. It also has a pantry car for on board catering.

== Accident ==
The locomotive and two coaches behind it derailed as the train entered the yard of Bangalore city railway station at 12:15 p.m on 29 August 2015. No passengers were hurt.
