= Baitarani Road railway station =

Railway station in Odisha

Baitarani Road
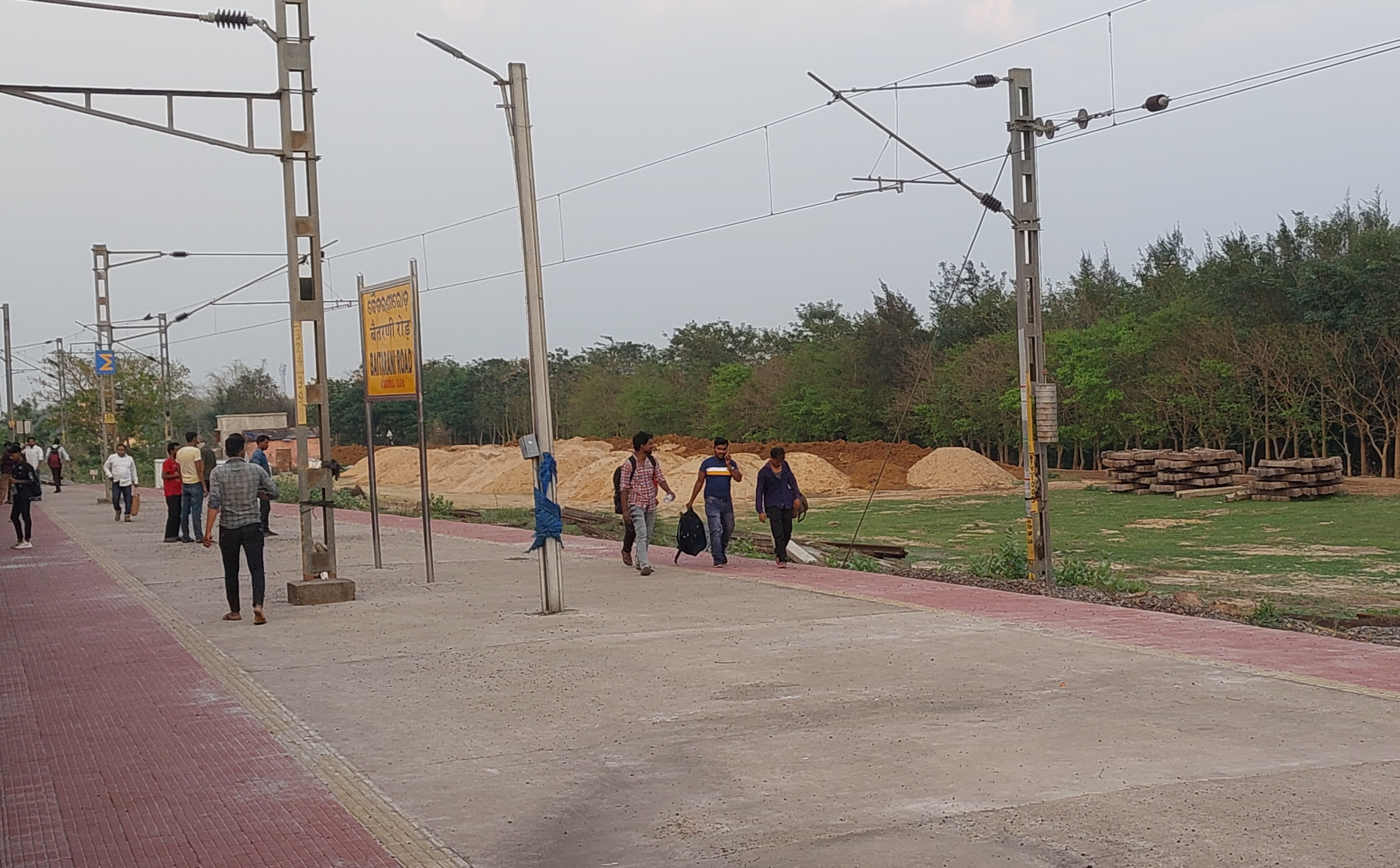

General information
- Location: Baitarani Road, Odisha; India
- Coordinates: 20°59′01″N 86°13′47″E
- System: Indian Railways station
- Owner: Ministry of Railways, Indian Railways
- Line: Howrah–Chennai main line
- Platforms: 4
- Tracks: 4

Construction
- Structure type: Standard (on ground)
- Parking: No

Other information
- Status: Functioning
- Station code: BTV
- Zone(s): East Coast Railway
- Division(s): Khurda Road
Location
- Location within India Location within Odisha

Baitarani Road railway station is a railway station on the East Coast Railway network in the state of Odisha, India. It serves Baitarani Road. Its code is BTV. It has four platforms. Passenger, MEMU, Express trains halt at Baitarani Road railway station.

== Major trains ==
- East Coast Express
- Santragachi–Paradeep Express

== See also ==
- Jajpur district
