= Soro railway station =

Railway station in Odisha, India

Soro

General information
- Location: Soro, Odisha; India
- Coordinates: 21°17′27″N 86°41′33″E
- System: Indian Railways station
- Owner: Ministry of Railways, Indian Railways
- Line: Howrah–Chennai main line
- Platforms: 4
- Tracks: 5

Construction
- Structure type: Standard (on ground)
- Parking: Yes

Other information
- Status: Functioning
- Station code: SORO
- Zone(s): South Eastern Railway
- Division(s): Kharagpur
Location
- Location within India Location within Odisha

Soro railway station is a railway station on the South Eastern Railway network in the state of Odisha, India. It serves Soro city. Its code is SORO. It has four platforms. Passenger, Express and Superfast trains halt at Soro railway station.

== Major trains ==
- Kalinga Utkal Express
- Sri Jagannath Express
- Dhauli Express
- East Coast Express
- Santragachi–Paradeep Express
- Odisha Sampark Kranti Express
- Bhubaneswar–Howrah Jan Shatabdi Express
- Neelachal Express
- Santragachi–Tirupati Express
- Malda Town–Bangalore Amrit Bharat Express
- Utkal Express

== See also ==
- Balasore district
