= Khallikot railway station =

Railway station in Odisha, India

Khallikot

General information
- Location: Khallikot, Odisha; India
- Coordinates: 19°36′42″N 85°07′43″E
- Elevation: 13 metres (43 ft)
- System: Indian Railways station
- Owner: Ministry of Railways, Indian Railways
- Line: Howrah–Chennai main line
- Platforms: 4
- Tracks: 4

Construction
- Structure type: Standard (on ground)
- Parking: Yes

Other information
- Status: Functioning
- Station code: KIT
- Zone(s): East Coast Railway
- Division(s): Khurda Road
Location
- Location within India Location within Odisha

Khallikot railway station is a railway station on the East Coast Railway network in the state of Odisha, India. It serves Khallikot town. Its code is KIT. It has three platforms. Passenger, MEMU, Express and Superfast trains halt at Khallikot railway station.

== Major trains ==
- East Coast Express
- Hirakhand Express
- Bhubaneshwar–Visakhapatnam Intercity Express
- Puri–Tirupati Express
- Puri–Ahmedabad Express
- Prashanti Express

== Gallery ==
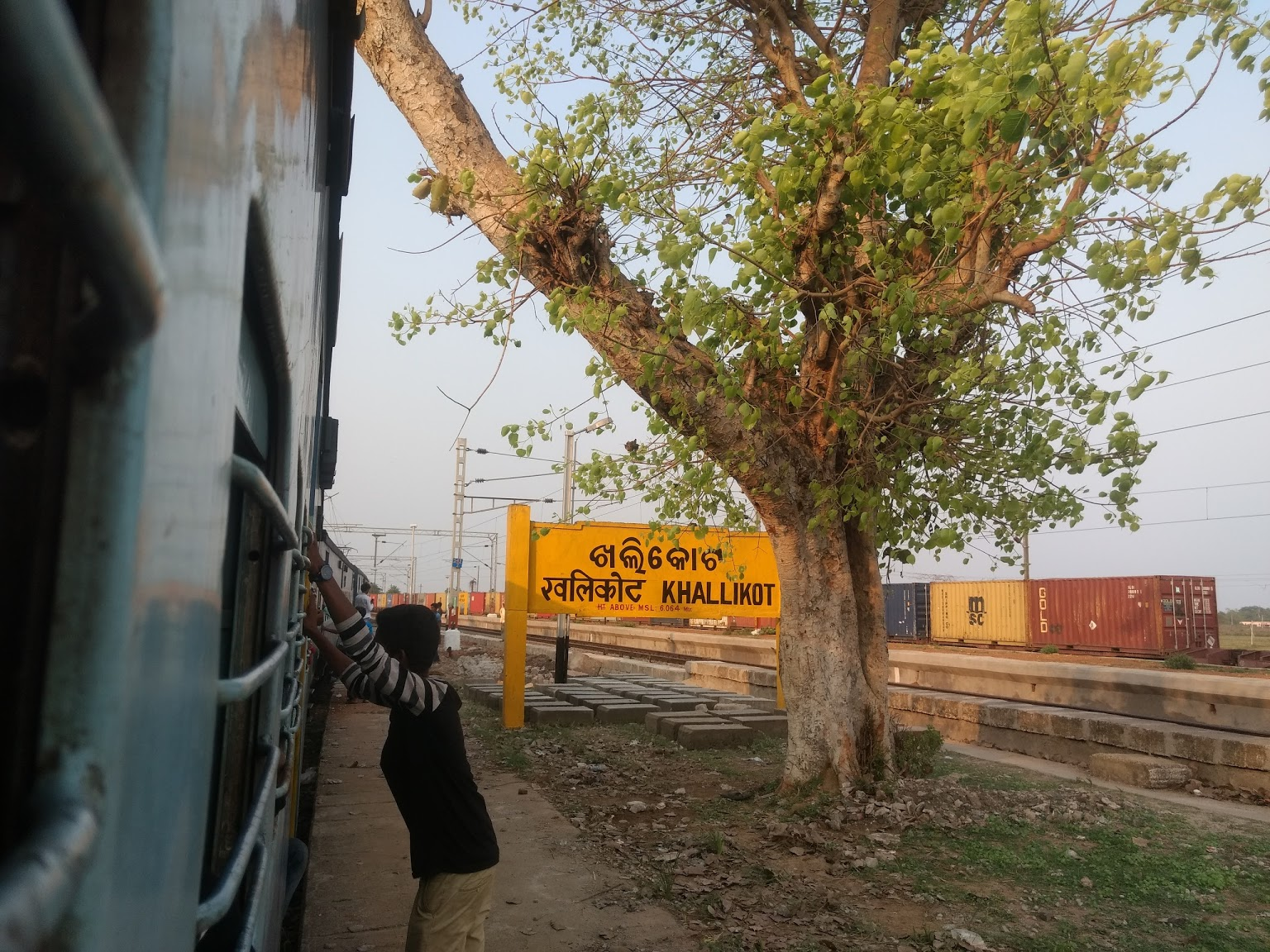
Khallikot railway station

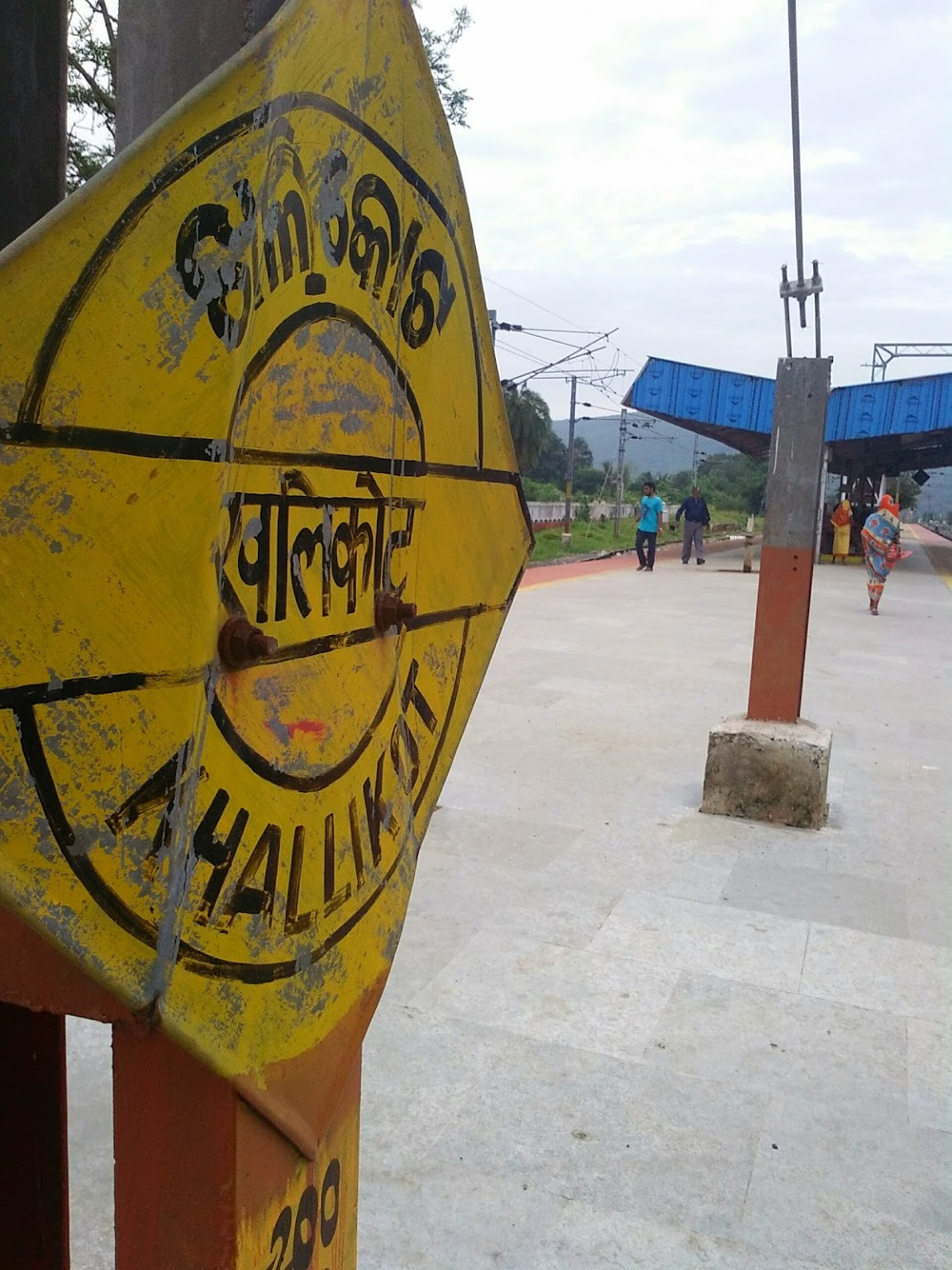
Khallikot railway station

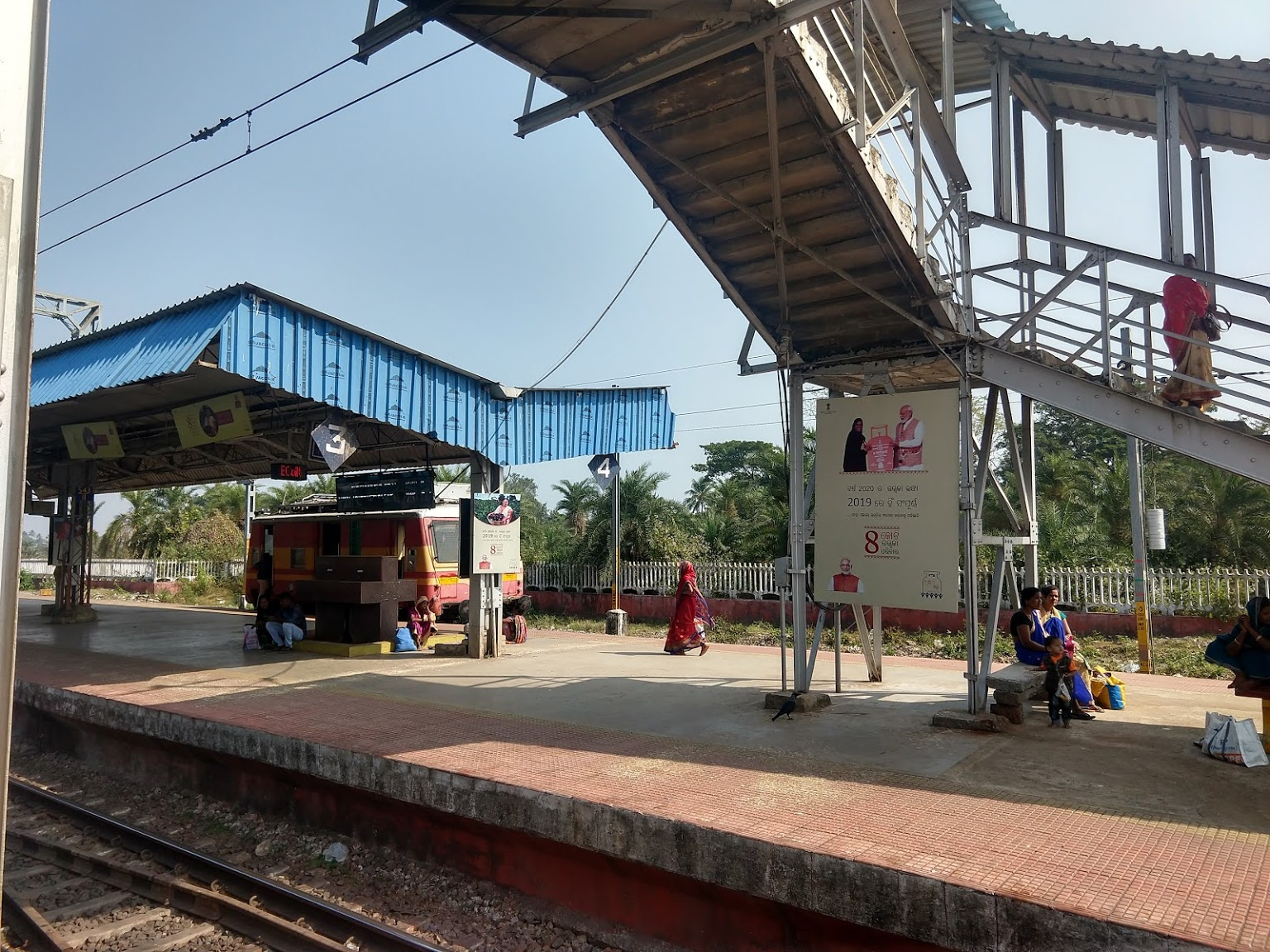
Khallikot railway station

Khallikot railway station

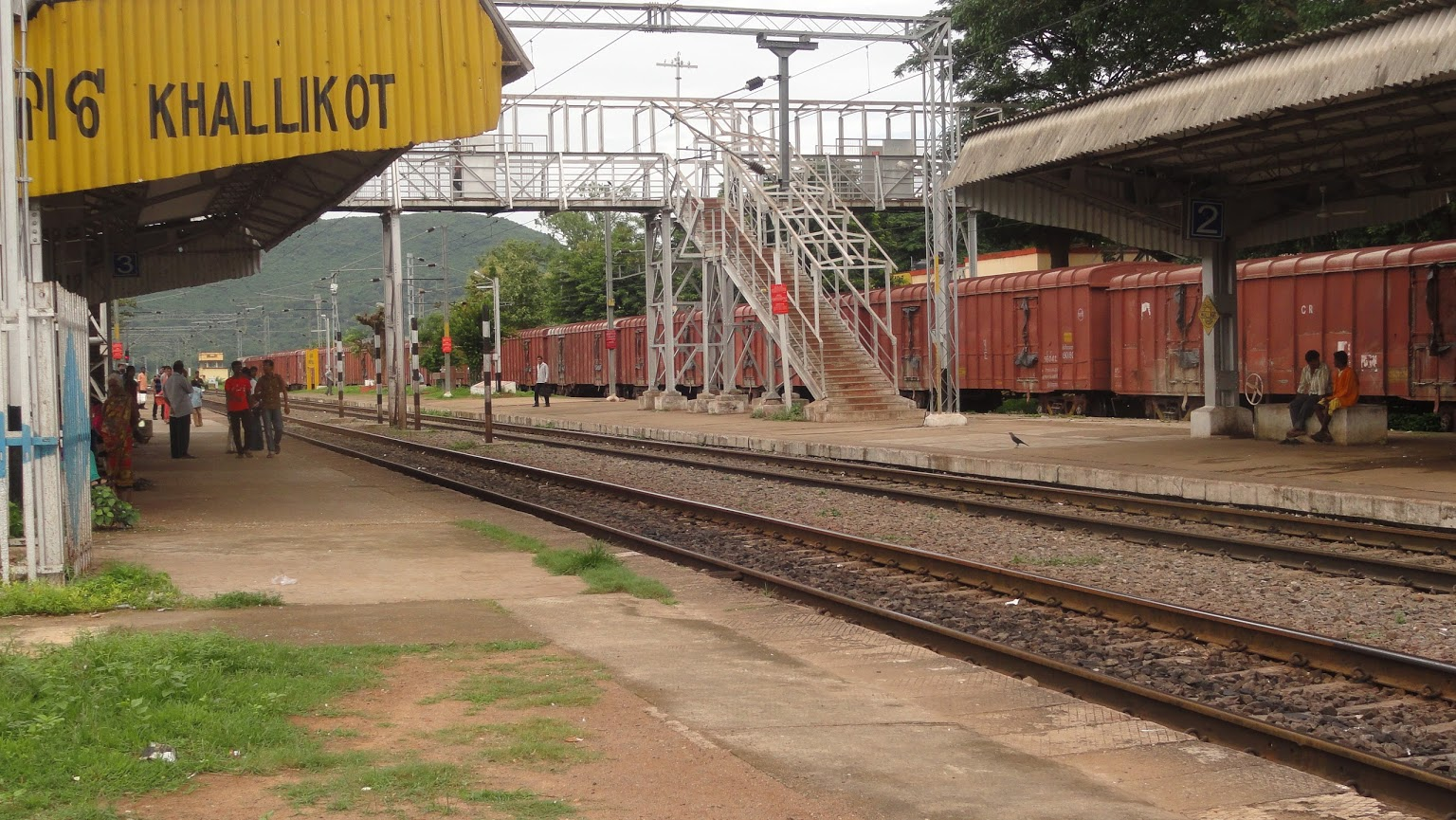
Khallikot railway station

== See also ==
- Ganjam district
