= East Coast Express =

Train in India

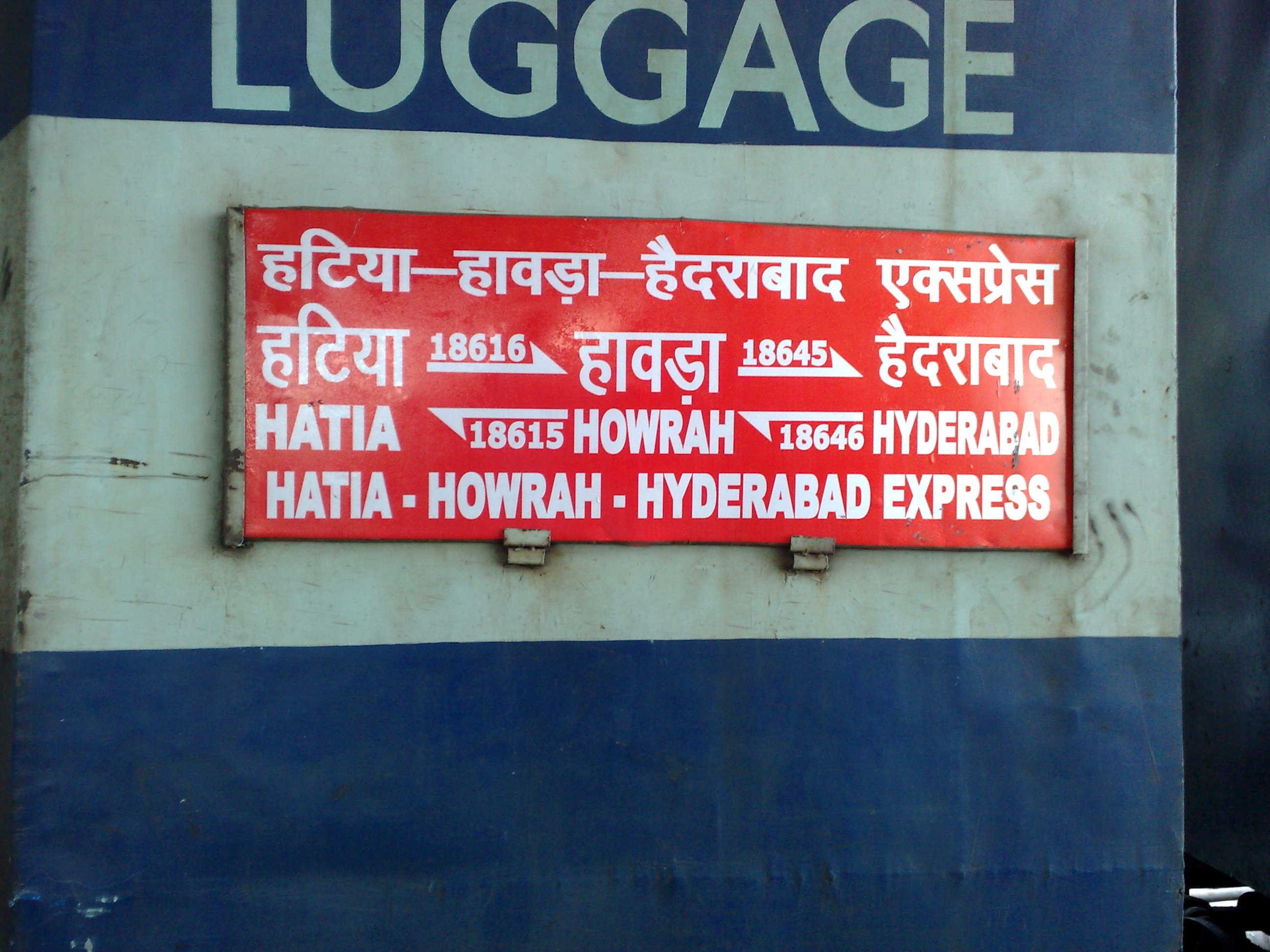
- East Coast Express train board with the old train numbers

Overview
- Service type: Express
- Locale: Telangana, Andhra Pradesh, Odisha & West Bengal
- First service: 1 August 1957; 68 years ago
- Current operator: South Eastern Railway

Route
- Termini: Charlapalli (CHZ); Kolkata Shalimar (SHM)
- Stops: 56
- Distance travelled: 1,566 km (973 mi)
- Average journey time: 31 hrs 10 mins
- Service frequency: Daily
- Train number: 18045 / 18046

On-board services
- Classes: AC 2 Tier, AC 3 Tier, AC 3 Tier Economy, Sleeper Class, General Unreserved
- Seating arrangements: Yes
- Sleeping arrangements: Yes
- Catering facilities: E-catering only
- Observation facilities: Large windows
- Baggage facilities: Available
- Other facilities: Below the seats

Technical
- Rolling stock: LHB coach
- Track gauge: 1,676 mm (5 ft 6 in)
- Operating speed: 51 km/h (32 mph) average including halts.

The 18045 / 18046 East Coast Express is a daily train that runs between Charlapalli (Hyderabad) and Shalimar (Kolkata). Earlier this train's terminating stations were Hyderabad Deccan and Howrah. From 2022 the terminal has been shifted from Howrah to Shalimar And on the other end from June 2025 Train Terminal has been shifted from Hyderabad Deccan to Charlapalli for decongesting the existing stations and to provide better service between Hyderabad and Kolkata. It is being operated with train numbers 18045/46 on a daily basis.

== Train composition ==
This train has 7 Sleeper Coaches, 5 3AC-Tier Coaches, 2 2AC-Tier Coaches, 2 3AC Economy Coaches, 2 General, 1 SLR Coach, 1 EOG Coach & 2 High Capacity Parcel Van making a total of 22 coaches.

== Locomotive ==
The train is hauled by a Lallaguda-based WAP-7 locomotive from Charlapalli to Vijayawada. It reverses there and gets another WAP-4 of Vijayawada loco shed and hauls it up to Visakhapatnam. It again reverses there a gets a WAP-4 from Santragachi loco shed or a WAP-7 from Visakhapatnam Electric Shed to haul the train up to Howrah.

== Route ==
18045 – East Coast Express – SHALIMAR (KOLKATA )to CHARLAPALLI (HYDERABAD)

Station name	Station code
Shalimar	SHM
Mecheda	MCA
Panskura Junction	PKU
Kharagpur Junction	KGP
Belda	BLDA
Jaleswar	JER
Basta	BTS
Rupsa Junction	ROP
Balasore	BLS
Soro	SORO
Markona	MKO
Bhadrakh	BHC
Baitarani Road	BTV
Korai Halt	KRIH
Jajpur Keonjhar Road	JJKR
Dhanmandal	DNM
Cuttack	CTC
Barang	BRAG
Bhubaneswar	BBS
Khurda Road	KUR
Nirakarpur	NKP
Kalupara Ghat	KAPG
Balugan	BALU
Chilka	CLKA
Khallikot	KIT
Chatrapur	CAP
Brahmapur	BAM
Ichchapuram	IPM
Sompeta	SPT
Palasa	PSA
Naupada	NWP
Srikakulam Road	CHE
Chipurupalle	CPP
Vizianagaram	VZM
Kothavalasa	KTV
Simhachalam	SCM
Visakhapatnam	VSKP
Duvvada	DVD
Anakapalle	AKP
Elamanchili	YLM
Tuni	TUNI
Annavaram	ANV
Pithapuram	PAP
Samalkot	SLO
Dwarapudi	DWP
Rajahmundry	RJY
Nidadavolu	NDD
Tadepalligudem	TDD
Eluru	EE
Vijayawada	BZA
Khammam	KMT
Mahbubabad	MABD
Warangal	WL
Kazipet	KZJ
Jangaon	ZN
Aler	ALER
Bhongir	BG
Charlapalli	CHZ
