= Soro, Balasore =

Soro
- Municipality/City
- Location in Odisha, India Soro (India)
- Coordinates: 21.29°N 86.69°E
- Country: India
- State: Odisha
- District: Balasore

Government
  - Type: Municipality
  - Body: Soro Municipality
- Elevation: 3 m (9.8 ft)

Population (2011)
  - Total: 150,000

Languages
  - Official: Odia
- Time zone: UTC+5:30 (IST)
- PIN: 756045
- Telephone code: 06788
- Vehicle registration: OD 01
- Sex ratio: 986 ♂/♀
- Website: soromunicipality.in

Soro is a municipality town and notified area council (NAC) in Balasore district in the Indian state of Odisha. It is about 181 km from the capital of the state Bhubaneswar and 35 km from the district headquarters Balasore. It is located on National Highway-16 (NH-16) between Balasore and Bhadrak cities.

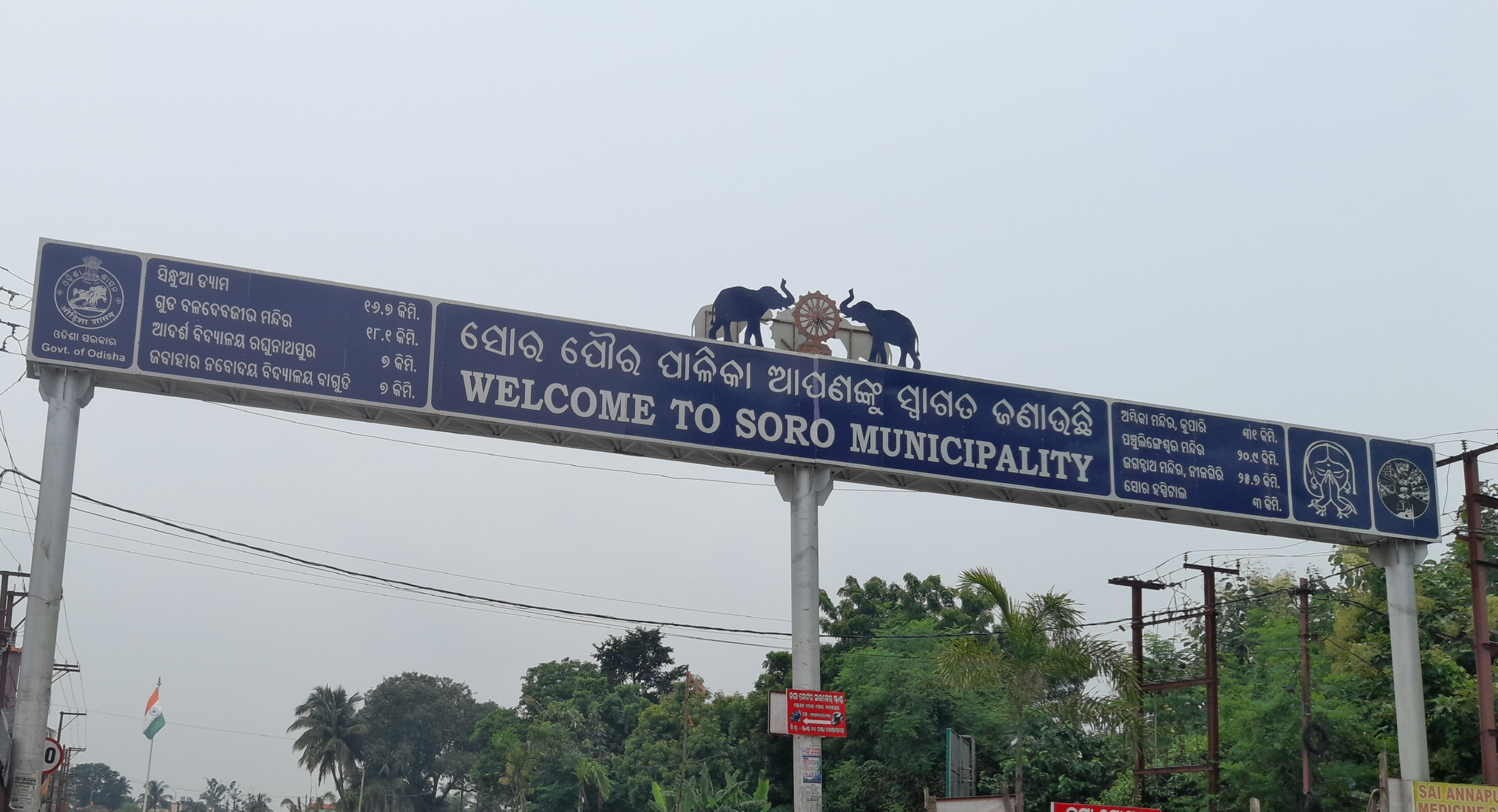
Soro municipality gantry

== Etymology ==
The name of the city is believed to be derived from the ancient settlement of Sarepahara, which is mentioned in a 7th-century copper plate grant of Somadatta. The inscription identifies Sarepahara with the present-day town of Soro.

== Geography ==
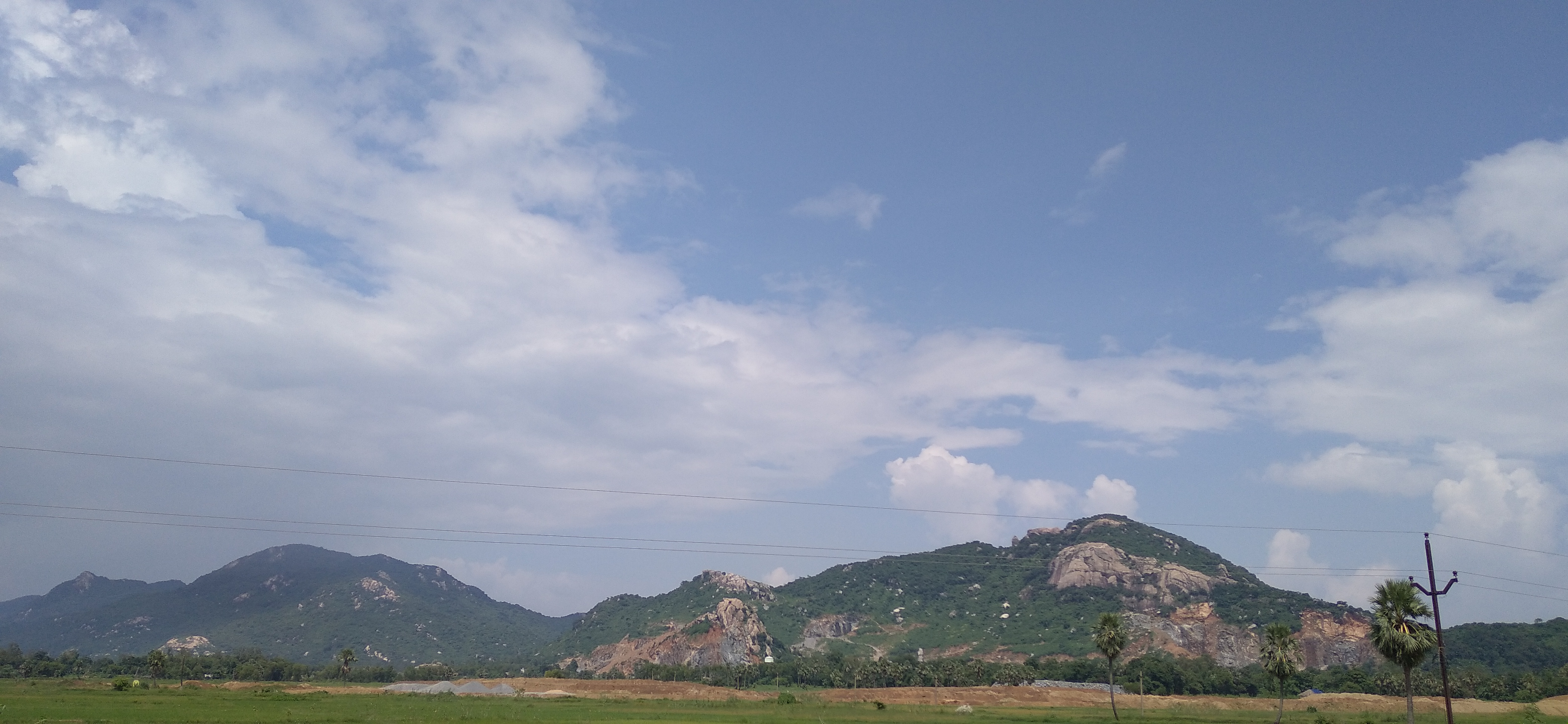
Bagudi hill

Soro is at 21.29°N 86.69°E. It has an average elevation of 3 metres (9 feet). The Bay Of Bengal is just about 20 km from the town. The hills of Deva Giri and Panchalingeswar stand just 5–7 km from the town. Sindhua dam is located 18 km from the town. The river Kansabansa flows to the south of the town. Soro is surrounded by Simulia tahasil, Khaira tahasil, Bahanaga tahasil. Land is very fertile, suitable for growing crops, especially rice.

== Economy ==
Soro is an emerging city in the Balasore district. It has so many local markets, majority of them are located in its two most business areas i.e. Adang bazaar and Uttareswar.

The Soro market is famous for its fresh Hilsa Fishes, and farm vegetables sold by the local community from nearby villages. The city is also responsible for business of Grocery, Clothes and other useful items on which nearby villages are dependent. It has various shopping malls like Reliance Smart Point, Cosmo Bazaar, Trends, Super Bazaar.

== Civic administration and utilities ==
The Soro Municipality oversees and manages civic infrastructure for the town's 19 wards. Residents of each ward elect a councilor to the Soro Municipality for a five-year term. Standing committees handle urban planning and maintain roads, government-aided schools, hospitals, and municipal markets. As Soro's apex body, the Municipality discharges its functions through the council, which comprises a chairperson, a Vice Chairperson and other elected members. The executive wing is headed by an executive officer. Soro Municipality's responsibilities include drainage and sewerage, sanitation, solid waste management and street lighting. As of 2013, the INC controlled the Soro Municipality; the Chairperson was Subhasmita Mohanty

Soro has lower courts: The Civil Court decides civil matters; the JFM Court rules in criminal cases.

Soro Police, a state police force with primary responsibilities in law enforcement and investigation in Soro area.

Citizens of Soro elect representative to India's lower house, the Lok Sabha as a part of Bhadrak constituency, and one representative to the state legislative assembly, through the constituency of Soro.

== Education ==
Soro town contains 5 colleges and 6 high schools and about 20 M.E. schools which spread the light of education not only in the town but in the surrounding areas also. Upendranath College is the premier college of the town which holds the dignity of being the best college in the locality as well as among the colleges affiliated to Fakir Mohan University. It is located by the NH-16. Soro women's college, situated near Idga Maidan (court chhak) is the only college offering higher education for girls. Both the college have two wings viz. +2 and +3. A centre of Odisha State Open University (OSOU) has been established in the town.

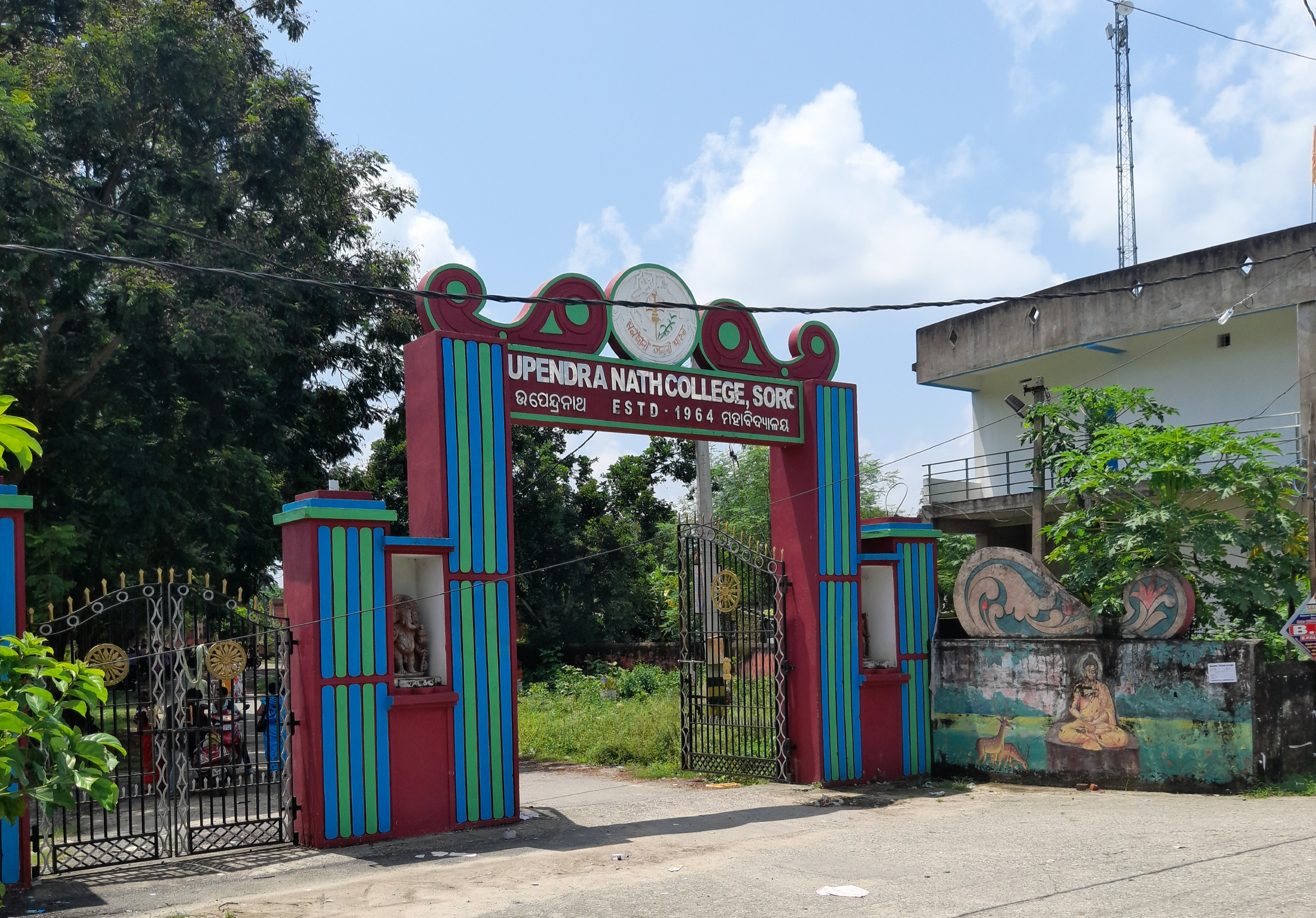
Upendranath College, Soro

=== Schools ===
Radhanath Bidyapitha and Satyananda High school are the two schools that have received recognition in state level for their performance matriculation results that include board rank holders.

Jawahar Navodaya Vidyalaya, Bagudi (also known as JNV Bagudi or JNV Balasore) is a public residential school in Bagudi village near Mangalpur. Government-run, it provides education to children predominantly from the rural areas and economically challenged families. It was established and is managed by Navodaya Vidyalaya Samiti (an autonomous organization of the Ministry of Human Resource Development and Department of Secondary Education and Higher Education). In accordance with the National Policy on Education (1986) of the government of India, the Jawahar Navodaya Vidyalaya Bagudi in the Balasore district was established during March 1987.

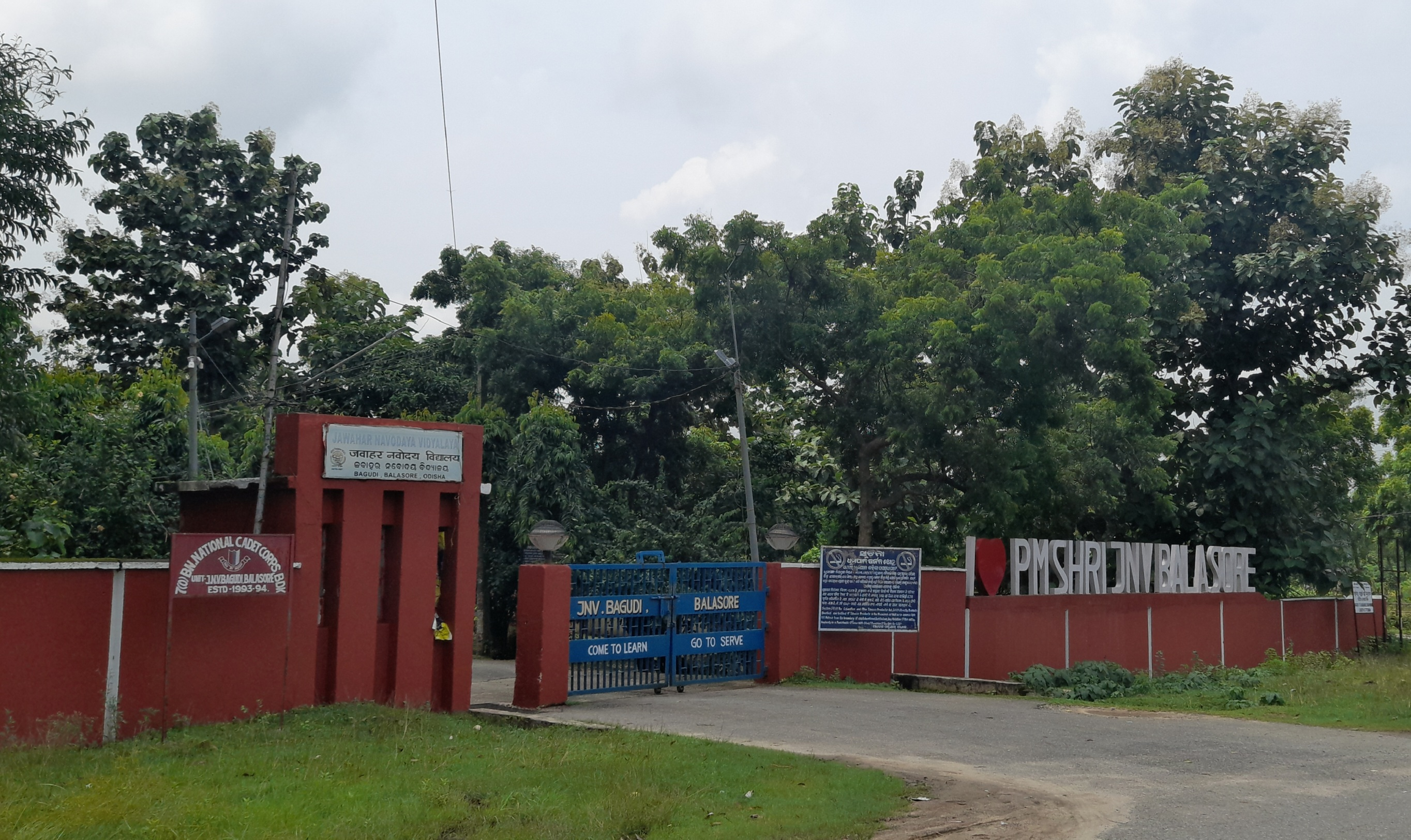
Jawahar Navodaya Vidyalaya, Bagudi

== Transport ==
Private operators run buses connecting Soro to cities in Odisha and with the neighbouring states of Jharkhand, West Bengal . Soro is connected to the rest of Odisha and India by National Highways-NH 16, which is a part of the Kolkata-Chennai prong of the Golden Quadrilateral.

=== Road ===
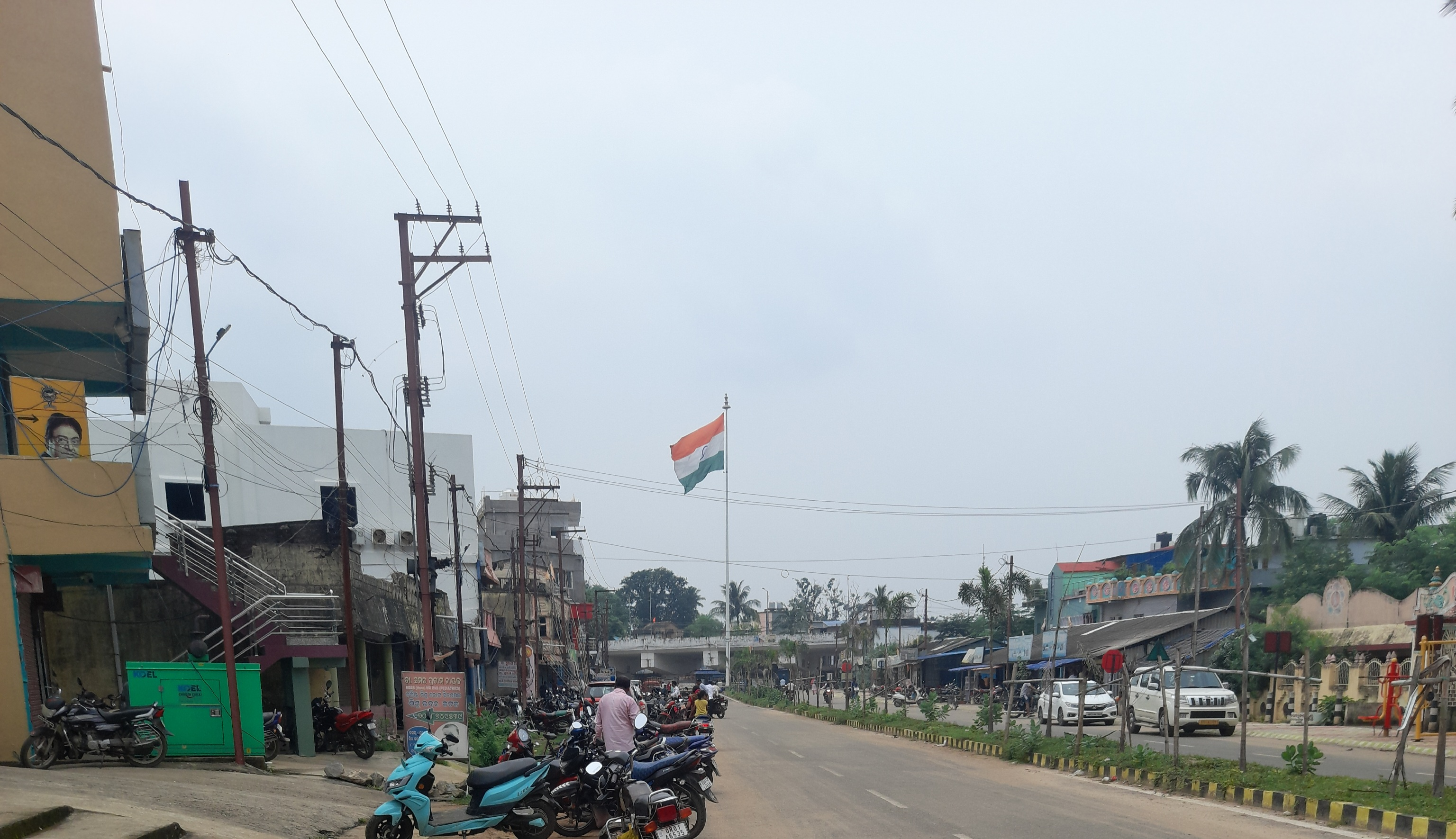
Soro station road

Soro has good network of Municipal and PWD roads. Auto rickshaws are available for hire and on a share basis throughout the town. In parts of the town, cycle rickshaws offer short trips. To ease traffic jams, over-bridges at major road junctions and expansion of roads are under construction.

=== Quick Commerce Availability ===
Soro has only two options of delivering service available for doorstep ordering of Food and Grocery items. Services like Jiomart and Zomato with limited delivery hours and are available in town.

=== Rail ===
Soro is a part of South Eastern Railway zone and is connected to major cities by daily express and passenger trains, but daily service to all metro cities is not available from here. Currently, the station has four platforms. There are plans to add two more platforms.

== Politics ==
Soro is one of the Vidhan Sabha seat of Odisha. Current MLA from Soro Assembly Constituency is Madhab Dhada of BJD, who won the seat in State elections in 2024.

== Notable people ==
- Radhanath Ray, Writer
- Kartik Mohapatra, Politician
- Dipanwit Dashmohapatra, Actor
