= Chilka railway station =

Railway station in Odisha, India

Chilka
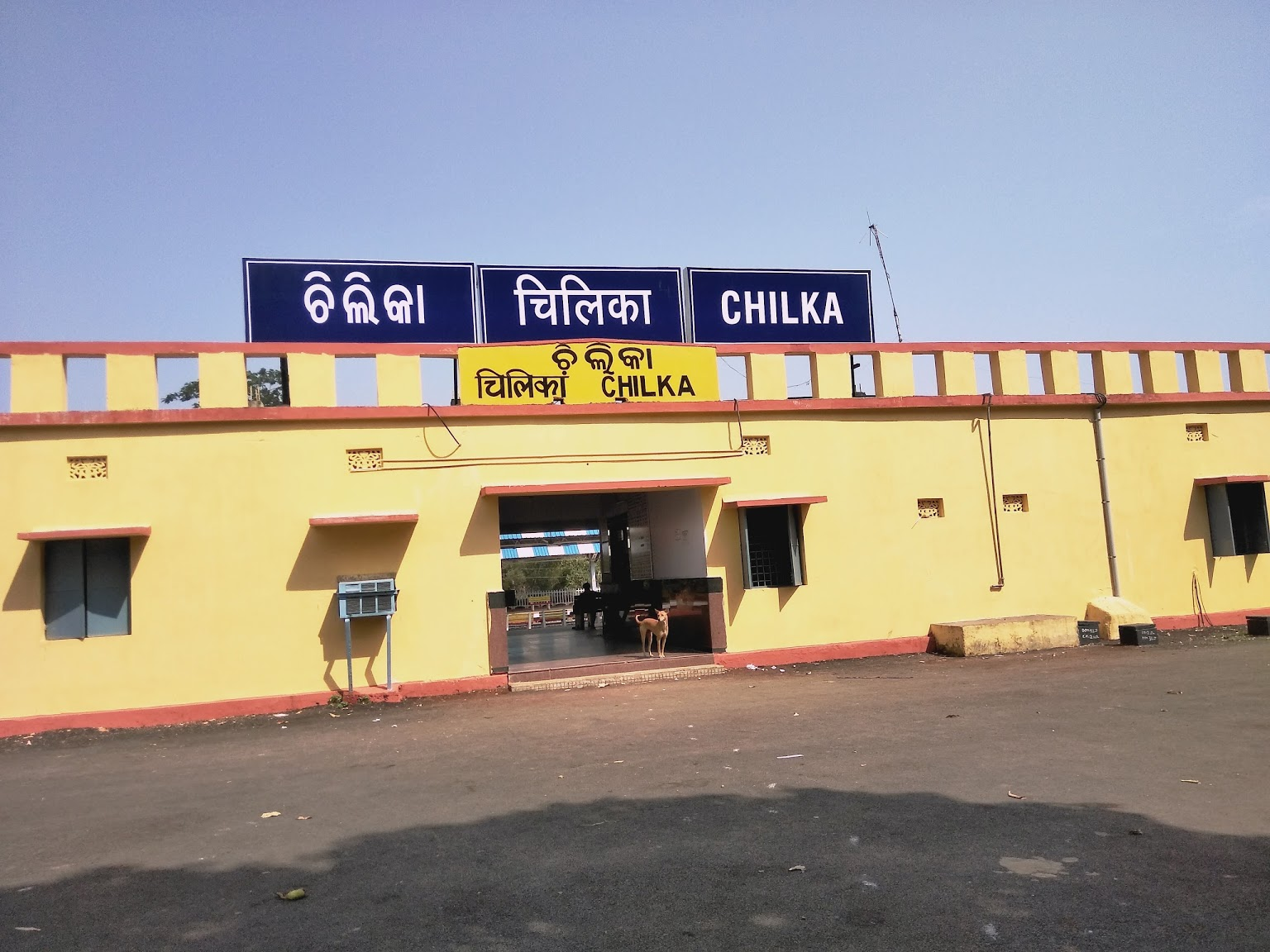

General information
- Location: Chilika, Odisha; India
- Coordinates: 19°41′11″N 85°10′46″E
- System: Indian Railways station
- Owner: Ministry of Railways, Indian Railways
- Line: Howrah–Chennai main line
- Platforms: 4
- Tracks: 4

Construction
- Structure type: Standard (on ground)
- Parking: No

Other information
- Status: Functioning
- Station code: CLKA
- Zone(s): East Coast Railway
- Division(s): Khurda Road
Location
- Location within India Location within Odisha

Chilka railway station is a railway station on the East Coast Railway network in the state of Odisha, India. It serves Chilka village. Its code is CLKA. It has four platforms. Passenger, MEMU, Express trains halt at Chilka railway station.

== Major trains ==
- East Coast Express
- Hirakhand Express
- Bhubaneshwar–Visakhapatnam Intercity Express
- Puri–Tirupati Express

== See also ==
- Khordha district

== Gallery ==
Chilka railway station

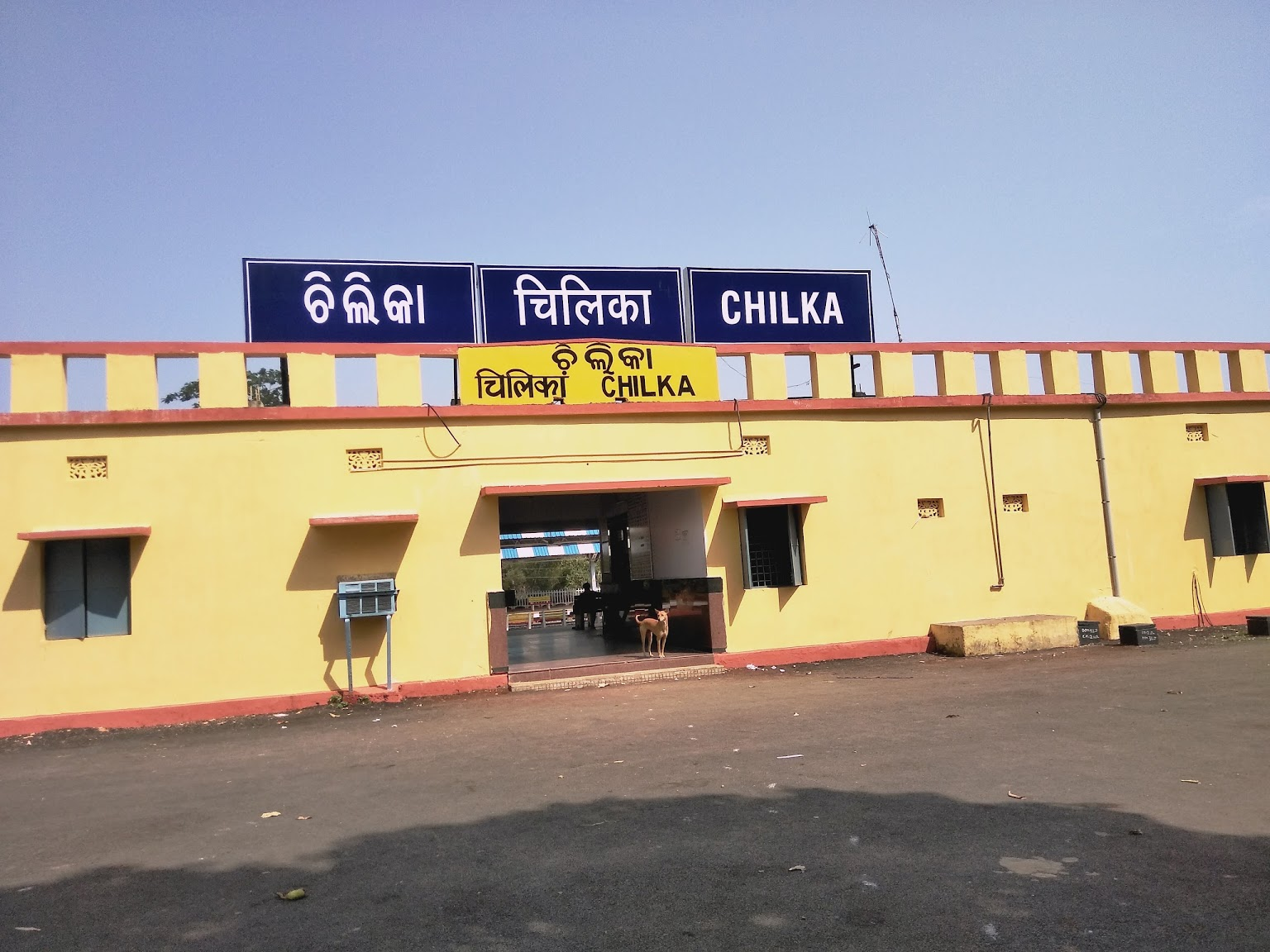
Chilka railway station

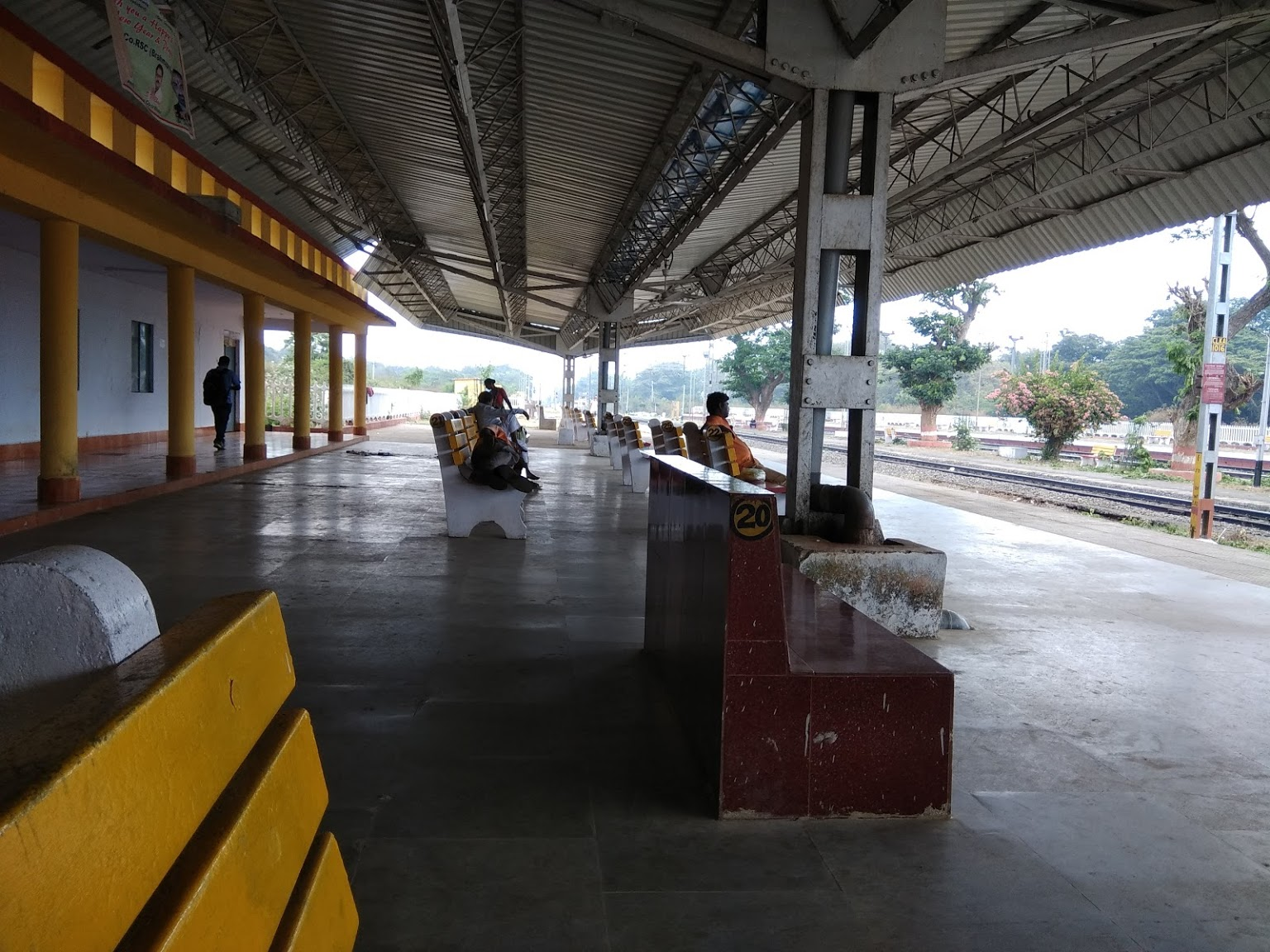
Chilka railway station

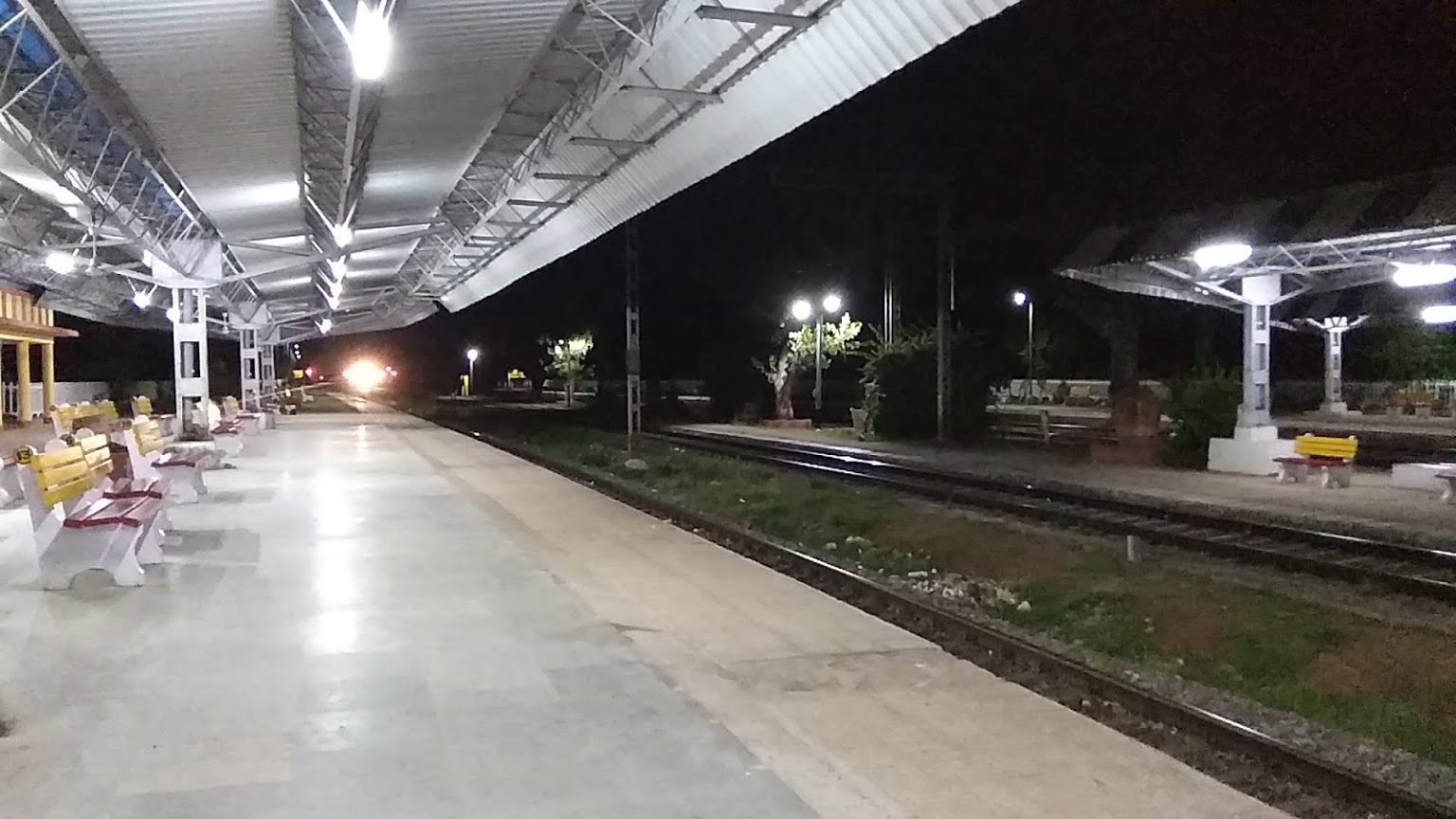
Chilka railway station

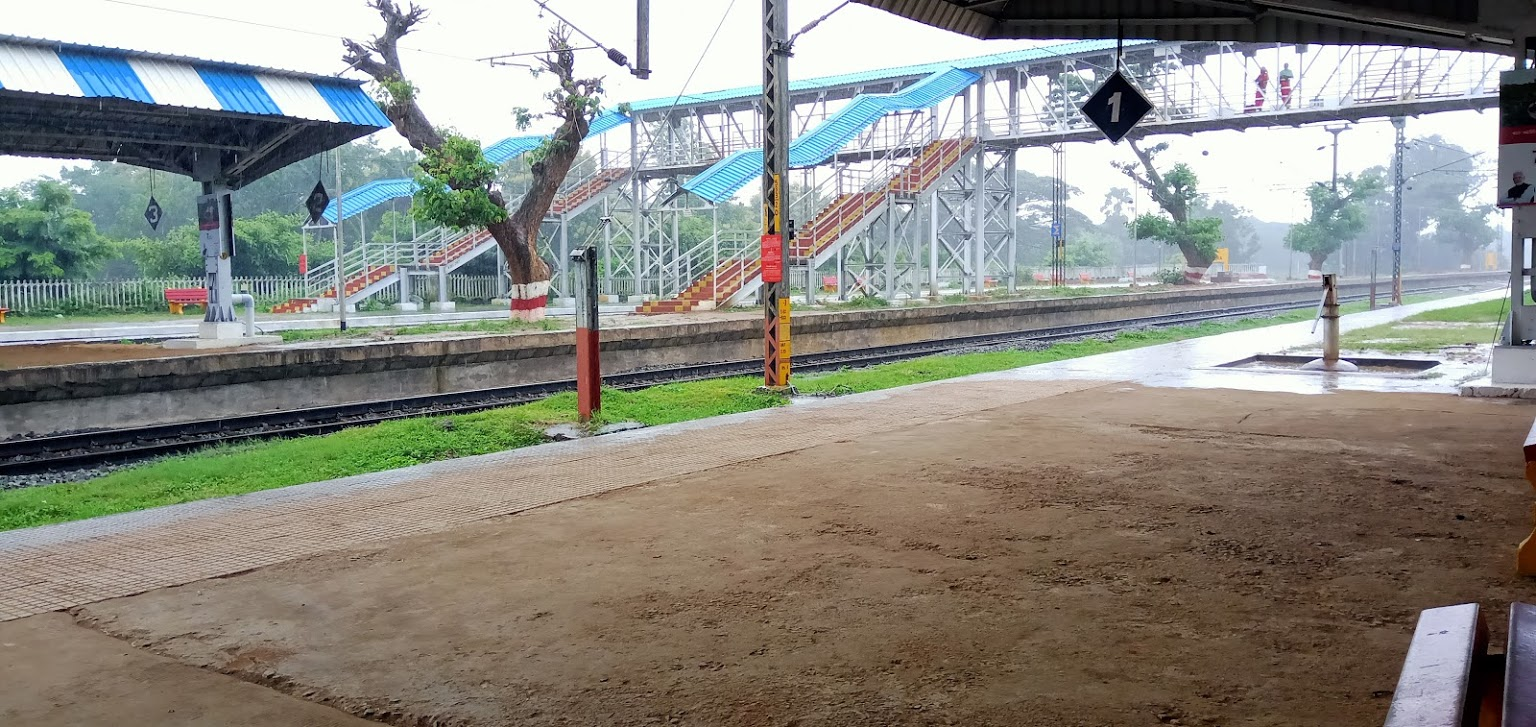
Chilka railway station

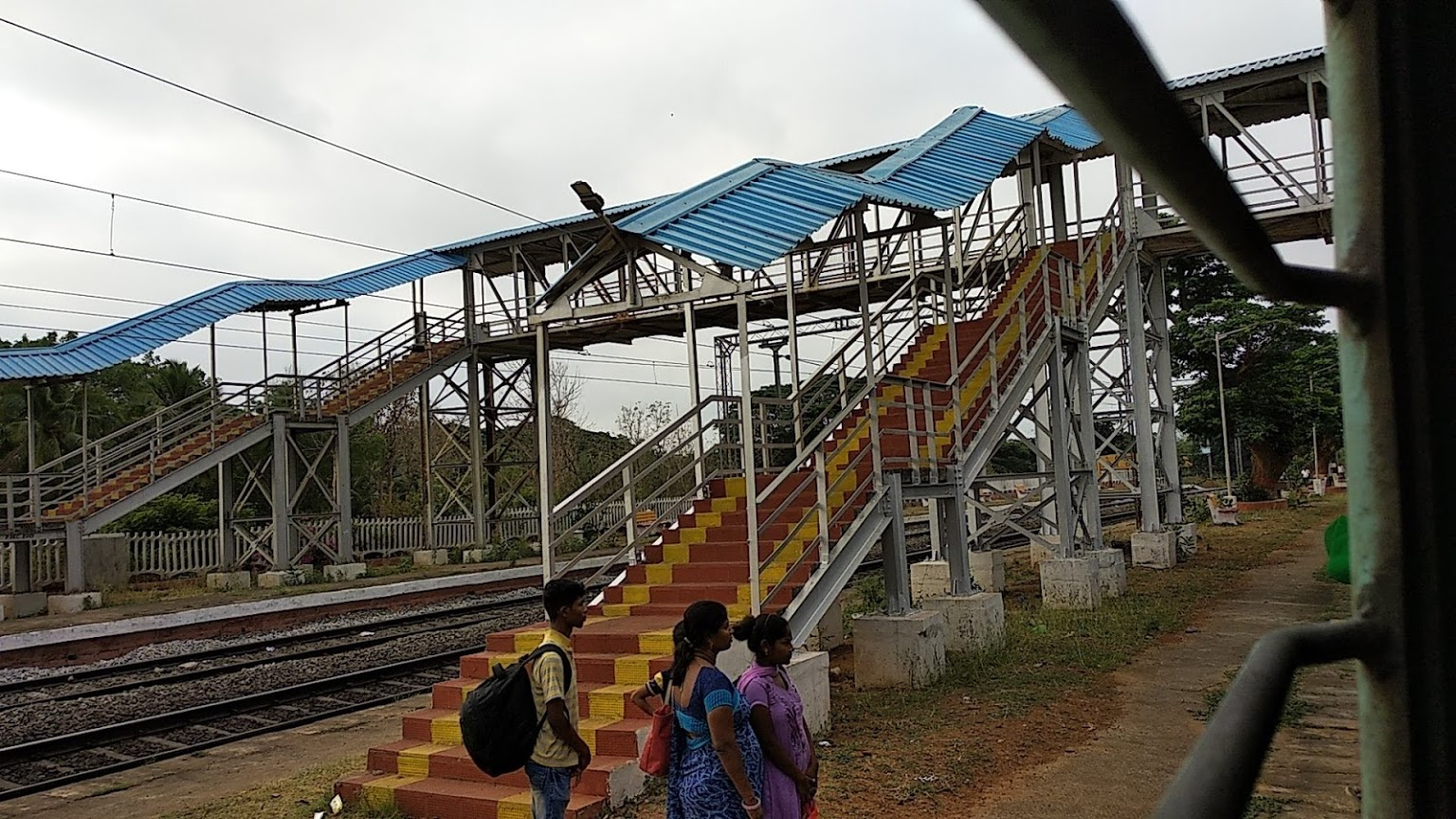
Chilka railway station
