= Kenduapada railway station =

Railway station on the East Coast Railway network in India

Kenduapada

General information
- Location: Kenduapada, Odisha; India
- Coordinates: 21°01′46″N 86°22′55″E
- System: Indian Railways station
- Owner: Ministry of Railways, Indian Railways
- Line: Howrah–Chennai main line
- Platforms: 4
- Tracks: 4

Construction
- Structure type: Standard (on ground)
- Parking: No

Other information
- Status: Functioning
- Station code: KED
- Zone(s): East Coast Railway
- Division(s): Khurda Road
Location
- Location within India Location within Odisha

Kenduapada railway station is a railway station on the East Coast Railway network in the state of Odisha, India. It serves Kenduapada village. Its code is KED. It has four platforms. Passenger, MEMU, Express trains halt at Kenduapada railway station.

== Major trains ==
- East Coast Express

== See also ==
- Bhadrak district
