= Markona railway station =

Railway station in India

Markona

General information
- Location: Markona, Odisha; India
- Coordinates: 21°11′43″N 86°35′46″E
- System: Indian Railways station
- Owner: Ministry of Railways, Indian Railways
- Line: Howrah–Chennai main line
- Platforms: 3
- Tracks: 4

Construction
- Structure type: Standard (on ground)
- Parking: No

Other information
- Status: Functioning
- Station code: MKO
- Zone(s): South Eastern Railway
- Division(s): Kharagpur
Location
- Location within India Location within Odisha

Markona railway station is a railway station on the South Eastern Railway network in the state of Odisha, India. It serves Markona village. Its code is MKO. It has three platforms. Passenger, Express and Superfast trains halt at Markona railway station.

== Major trains ==
- Dhauli Express
- East Coast Express

== See also ==
- Balasore District
