= Lokmanya Tilak Terminus–Bhubaneswar Superfast Express =

Indian superfast train

Lokmanya Tilak Terminus - Bhubaneswar Superfast Express
Overview
- Service type: Superfast
- First service: 25 February 2009; 16 years ago
- Current operator: East Coast Railway zone

Route
- Termini: Lokmanya Tilak Terminus (LTT); Bhubaneswar (BBS)
- Stops: 20
- Distance travelled: 1,790 km (1,112 mi)
- Average journey time: 31h
- Service frequency: bi-weekly (Note: Runs two days in a week for every direction.)
- Train number: 12879/12880

On-board services
- Classes: AC 2 tier, AC 3 tier, Sleeper Class, General Unreserved
- Sleeping arrangements: Yes
- Catering facilities: On-board Catering; E-Catering
- Entertainment facilities: No
- Baggage facilities: No
- Other facilities: Below the seats

Technical
- Rolling stock: LHB Coaches
- Track gauge: 1,676 mm (5 ft 6 in)
- Operating speed: 58 km/h (36 mph), including halts

The Lokmanya Tilak Terminus - Bhubaneswar Superfast Express is a Superfast train belonging to East Coast Railway zone that runs between Lokmanya Tilak Terminus and Bhubaneswar in India. It is currently being operated with 12879/12880 train numbers on bi-weekly basis.

== Service ==
The 12879/Lokmanya Tilak Terminus - Bhubaneswar SF Express has an average speed of 58 km/h and covers 1790 km in 31h. The 12880/Bhubaneswar - Lokmanya Tilak Terminus SF Express has an average speed of 59 km/h and covers 1790 km in 30h 25m.

== Route and halts ==
The halts of the train are:

- Lokmanya Tilak Terminus
- Thane
- Kalyan Junction
- Nasik Road
- Manmad Junction
- Bhusaval Junction
- Akola Junction
- Nagpur Junction
- Raipur Junction
- Bilaspur Junction
- Champa Junction
- Raigarh
- Belpahar
- Jharsuguda Road
- Sambalpur Junction
- Angul
- Talcher road
- Dhenkanal
- Cuttack Junction
- Bhubaneswar

== Coach composite ==
The train has Modern LHB rakes with a maximum speed of 110 km/h. The train consists of 22 coaches :

- 1 AC II Tier
- 4 AC III Tier
- 11 Sleeper Coaches
- 1 Pantry Car
- 3 General Unreserved
- 2 EOG

== Traction ==
Both trains are hauled by an Electric Loco Shed, Vadodara based WAP-4E or Bhilai Loco Shed based WAP-7 electric locomotive from Lokmanya Tilak Terminus to Bhubaneswar.

== Rake sharing ==
The train shares its rake with 12819/12820 Odisha Sampark Kranti Express and 22879/22880 Bhubaneswar - Tirupati Superfast Express.

== Direction reversal ==
Train Reverses its direction twice:

- Jharsuguda Junction (Discontinued w.e.f. 15 October 2019. Stoppage replaced by Jharsuguda Road)
- Sambalpur Junction (Temporarily discontinued w.e.f. 21.09.2024 to 01.02.2025 due to Yard restructuring. Stoppage provided at Sambalpur City)

== See also ==
- Bhubaneswar railway station
- Lokmanya Tilak Terminus
- Odisha Sampark Kranti Express
- Bhubaneswar - Tirupati Superfast Express
