= Bhubaneswar–Tirupati Superfast Express =

Train in India

Overview
- Service type: Superfast
- First service: 14 September 2013; 12 years ago
- Current operator: East Coast Railway zone

Route
- Termini: Bhubaneswar (BBS); Tirupati (TPTY)
- Stops: 19
- Distance travelled: 1,181 km (734 mi)
- Average journey time: 21h 25m
- Service frequency: Weekly (Note: Runs one day in a week for every direction.)
- Train number: 22879/22880

On-board services
- Classes: AC 2 tier, AC 3 tier, Sleeper Class, General Unreserved
- Sleeping arrangements: Yes
- Catering facilities: On-board Catering; E-Catering
- Entertainment facilities: No
- Baggage facilities: No
- Other facilities: Below the seats

Technical
- Rolling stock: LHB Coaches
- Track gauge: 1,676 mm (5 ft 6 in)
- Operating speed: 55 km/h (34 mph), including halts
Route map
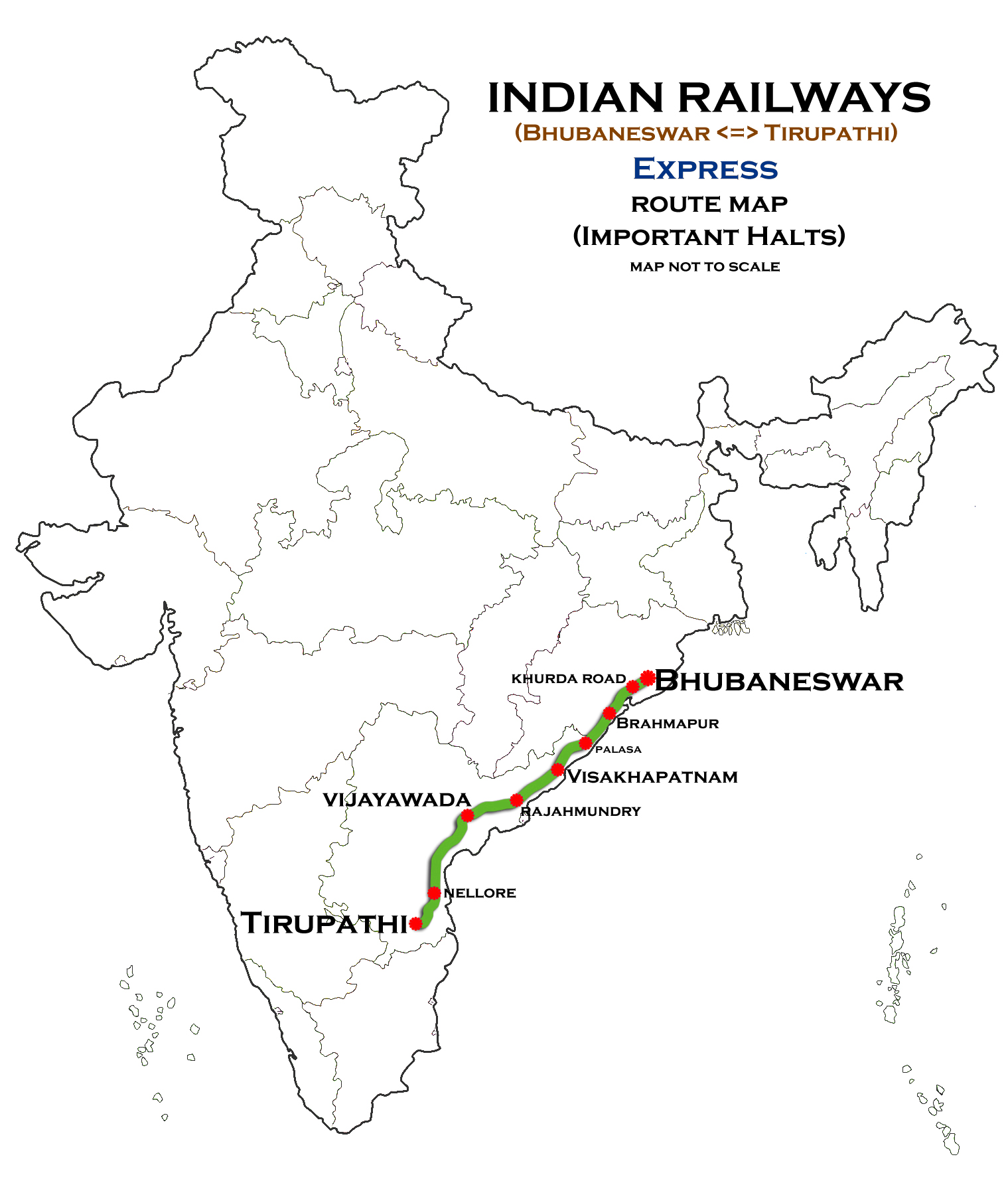

The Bhubaneswar–Tirupati Superfast Express is a Superfast train belonging to East Coast Railway zone that runs between Bhubaneswar and Tirupati in India. It is currently being operated with 22879/22880 train numbers on a weekly basis.

== Service ==
The 22879/Bhubaneswar–Tirupati Weekly SF Express has an average speed of 55 km/h and covers 1181 km in 21h 25m. The 22880/Tirupati Bhubaneswar Weekly SF Express has an average speed of 56 km/h and covers 1181 km in 20h 55m.

== Route and halts ==
The important halts of the train are:

- Bhubaneswar
- Khurda Road Junction
- Brahmapur
- Ichchapuram
- Sompeta
- Palasa
- Srikakulam Road
- Vizianagaram Junction
- Visakhapatnam Junction
- Samalkot Junction
- Rajahmundry
- Eluru
- Vijayawada Junction
- Ongole
- Nellore
- Gudur Junction
- Renigunta Junction
- Tirupati

== Coach composite ==
The train has Modern LHB rakes with a maximum speed of 110 km/h. The train consists of 22 coaches :

- 1 AC II Tier
- 4 AC III Tier
- 11 Sleeper Coaches
- 1 Pantry Car
- 3 General Unreserved
- 2 EOG

== Traction ==
Both trains are hauled by a Visakhapatnam Loco Shed based WAP-7 electric locomotive from Bhubaneswar to Tirupati and vice versa.

== Rake sharing ==
The train shares its rake with;

- 12819/12820 Odisha Sampark Kranti Express,
- 12879/12880 Lokmanya Tilak Terminus–Bhubaneswar Superfast Express.

== See also ==
- Hapa railway station
- Madgaon Junction railway station
- Lokmanya Tilak Terminus–Bhubaneswar Superfast Express
- Odisha Sampark Kranti Express
