= Chatrapur railway station =

Railway station in Odisha, India

Chatrapur
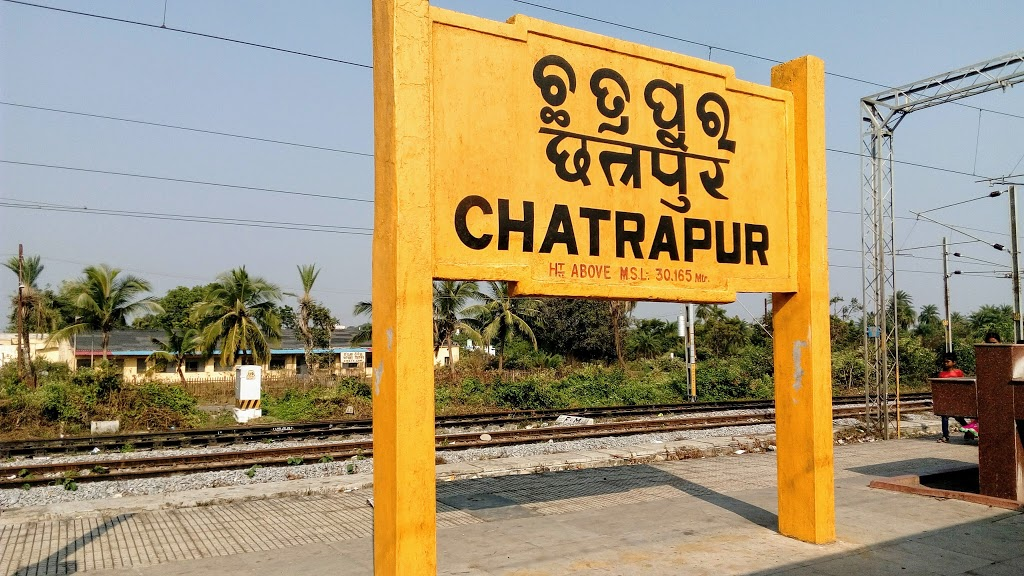
- Chatrapur railway station

General information
- Location: SH 36, Chatrapur, Odisha; India
- Coordinates: 19.3592°N 84.9737°E
- Elevation: 35 metres (115 ft)
- System: Two track Indian railways
- Owner: Indian Railways
- Operator: Khurda Road railway division
- Platforms: 4
- Tracks: 9
- Connections: Auto stand

Construction
- Structure type: Standard (on-ground station)
- Parking: Yes
- Cycle facilities: No

Other information
- Status: Functioning
- Station code: CAP
- Fare zone: ECoR

History
- Opened: 1899; 127 years ago

Services
Preceding station	Indian Railways	Following station
Chatrapur Court towards Howrah Junction	East Coast Railway zone Khurda Road–Visakhapatnam section of Howrah–Chennai main line	Narasimhapura towards Chennai Central
Location
- Location within Odisha Location within India

Chhatrapur railway station is one of two railway stations in Chatrapur, this being the main railway station in Ganjam district, Odisha. Its code is CAP . It serves Chhatrapur city and another one is Chatrapur Court halt, which code is CAPC. It is situated in the heart of the town. The railway station is category NSG-4. Comes under East Coast railway zone & Khurda Road division. 52 trains stops at this station.

== Infrastructure ==
The main station consists of four platforms. There is a pedestrian bridge, the only one in Odisha, which installed by the Eco railway. For the passengers to stay in retiring room, the dormitory facility also available, which one can opt to book through IRCTC web portal. Outside of the station there is a SBI ATM.

Court station only having two platforms.

== Line ==
The station is situated on the East Coast railway line which is a major route connecting the two metros Kolkata and Chennai of India.

== Trains ==
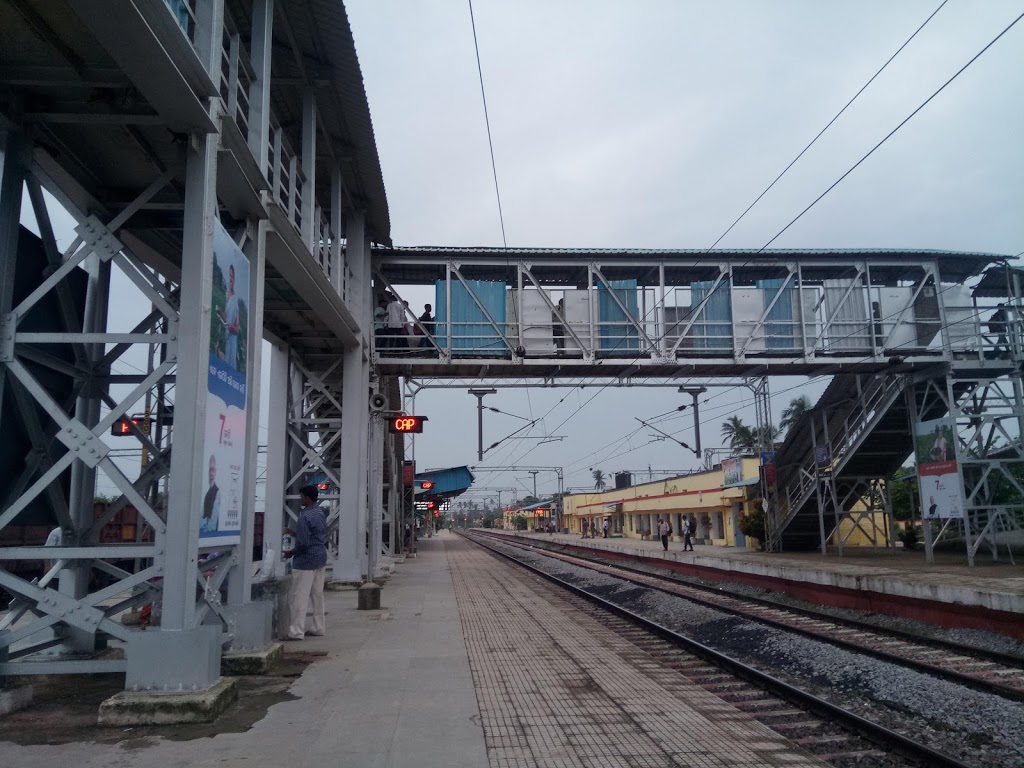
Chatrapur railway station

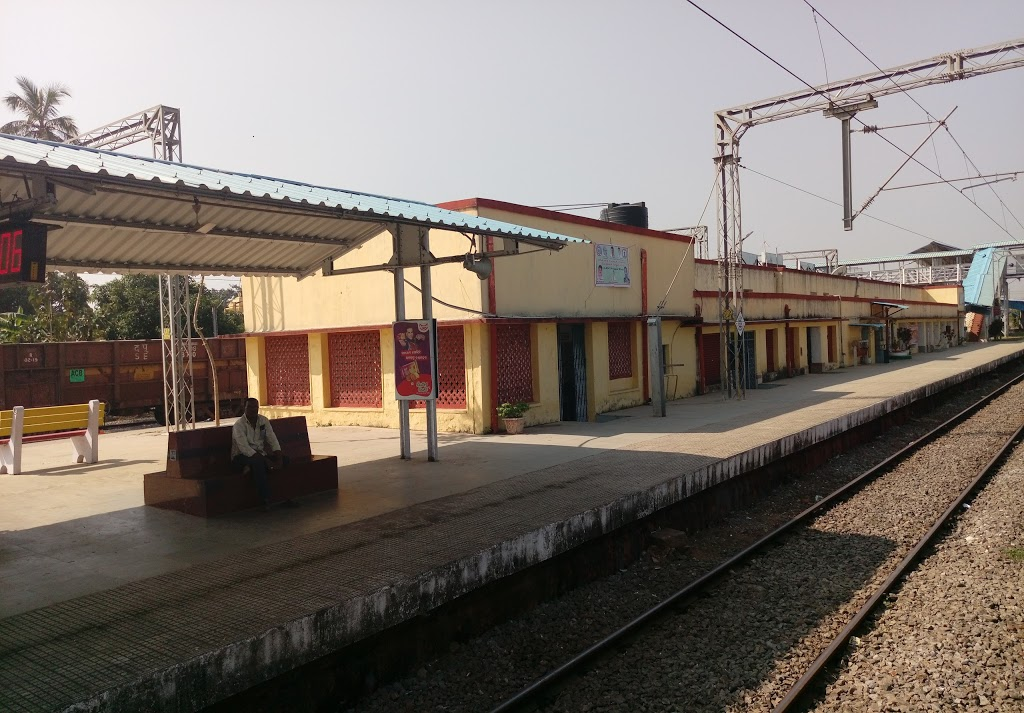
Chatrapur railway station

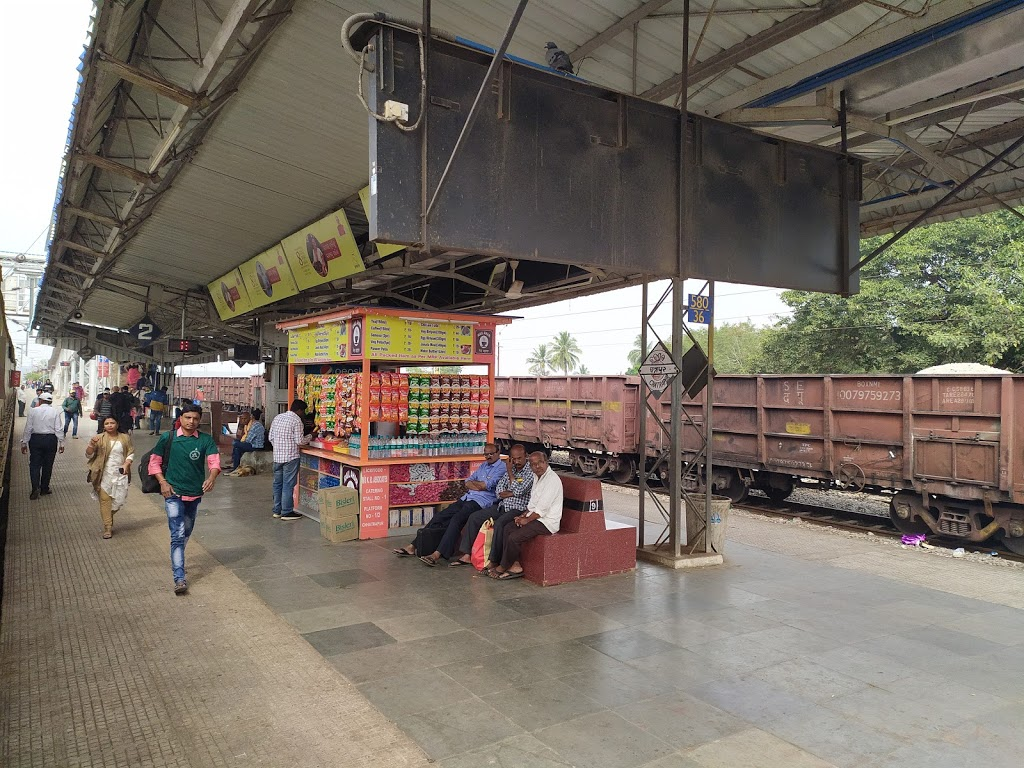
Chatrapur railway station

- Konark Express
- Bhubaneswar–Tirupati Superfast Express
- Visakhapatnam–Tatanagar Superfast Express
- Bhubaneswar–Brahmapur Passenger
- Visakha Express
- East Coast Express
- Bhubaneswar–Tirupati Superfast Express
- Tirupati–Bhubaneswar Superfast Express
- Santragachi–Chennai Central Antyodaya Express
- Bhubaneswar–Palasa Passenger
- Hirakhand Express
- Puri–Gandhidham Weekly Superfast Express (via Vizianagaram)
- Visakha Express
- Howrah–Chennai Central Mail
- Puri–Okha Dwarka Express
- Konark Express
- Khurda Road–Brahmapur MEMU Special
- Puri–Tirupati Express
- Bhubaneswar–Visakhapatnam Intercity Superfast Express
- Cuttack–Brahmapur MEMU
- Cuttack–Brahmapur Fast Passenger
- Okha–Puri Dwarka Express
- Brahmapur – Bhubaneswar Passenger
- Prasanti Express
- Chennai Central–Santragachi Antyodaya Express
- Puri-Chennai Central Weekly Superfast Express
- East Coast Express
- Yesvantpur–Puri Weekly Garib Rath Express
- Junagarh Road–Bhubaneswar Express (Hirakhand Link)
- Palasa–Bhubaneswar Passenger
- Brahmapur–Khurda Road MEMU Special
- Bhubaneswar–Junagarh Road Link Express (Hirakhand Link)
- Ahmedabad–Puri SF Express (via Brahmapur)
- Puri–Yesvantpur Weekly Garib Rath Express
- Gunupur–Rourkela Rajya Rani Express
- Gandhidham–Puri Weekly Superfast Express (via Vizianagaram)
- Cuttack–Palasa Passenger
- Visakhapatnam–Paradeep Superfast Express
- Hirakhand Express
- Palasa–Cuttack Passenger
- Paradeep–Vishakapatnam Superfast Express
- Gunupur–Puri Passenger
- Hirakud (Hirakund) Express
- Brahmapur–Cuttack MEMU
- Visakhapatnam–Bhubaneswar Superfast InterCity Express
- Tirupati–Bhubaneswar Superfast Express
- Prasanti Express
- Rourkela–Gunupur Rajya Rani Express
- Puri–Gunupur Passenger
- Chennai Central–Howrah Mail
- Puri–Ahmedabad Superfast Express (via Brahmapur)
- Brahmapur–Cuttack Fast Passenger
- Tirupati–Puri Express
- Tatanagar–Visakhapatnam Weekly Superfast Express
- Hirakud (Hirakund) Express
- Chennai Central–Puri Weekly Superfast Express
