= Chatrapur Court railway station =

Railway station in Odisha

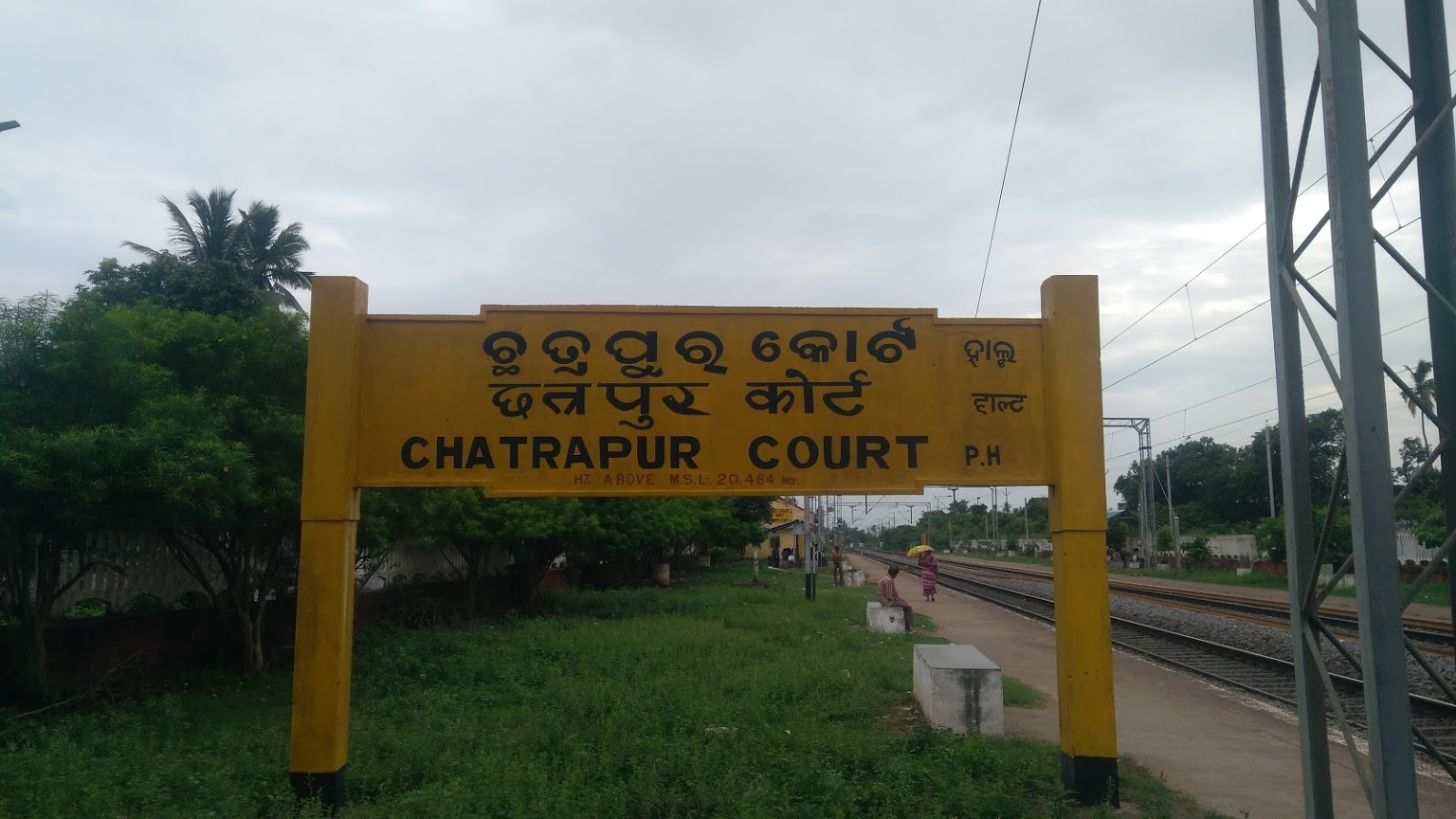
- Chatrapur Court railway station

General information
- Location: Nagulupeta, Chatrapur, Ganjam district, Odisha; India
- Coordinates: 19.358941°N 85.982543°E
- Elevation: 33 m (108 ft)
- System: Passenger train station
- Owner: Indian Railways
- Operator: East Coast Railway
- Line: Howrah–Chennai main line
- Platforms: 2
- Tracks: 2

Construction
- Structure type: Standard (on-ground station)

Other information
- Status: Functioning
- Station code: CAPC
- Zone(s): East Coast Railway zone
- Division(s): Khurda Road

History
- Opened: 1899
- Former names: East Coast State Railway

Services
Preceding station	Indian Railways	Following station
Ganjam towards Howrah Junction	East Coast Railway zone Howrah–Chennai main line	Chatrapur towards Chennai Central
Location
- Location within India Location within Odisha

Chatrapur Court railway station is a railway station on Khurda Road–Visakhapatnam section, part of the Howrah–Chennai main line under Khurda Road railway division of East Coast Railway zone. It is situated at Nagulupeta, Chatrapur in Ganjam district in the Indian state of Odisha.

== History ==
In between 1893 and 1896, the coastal railway track from Cuttack to Vijayawada was built and opened to traffic by East Coast State Railway. The route was electrified in several phases. Khurda–Visakhapatnam section was completely electrified by 2002 and Howrah–Chennai route was fully electrified in 2005.

== Images ==
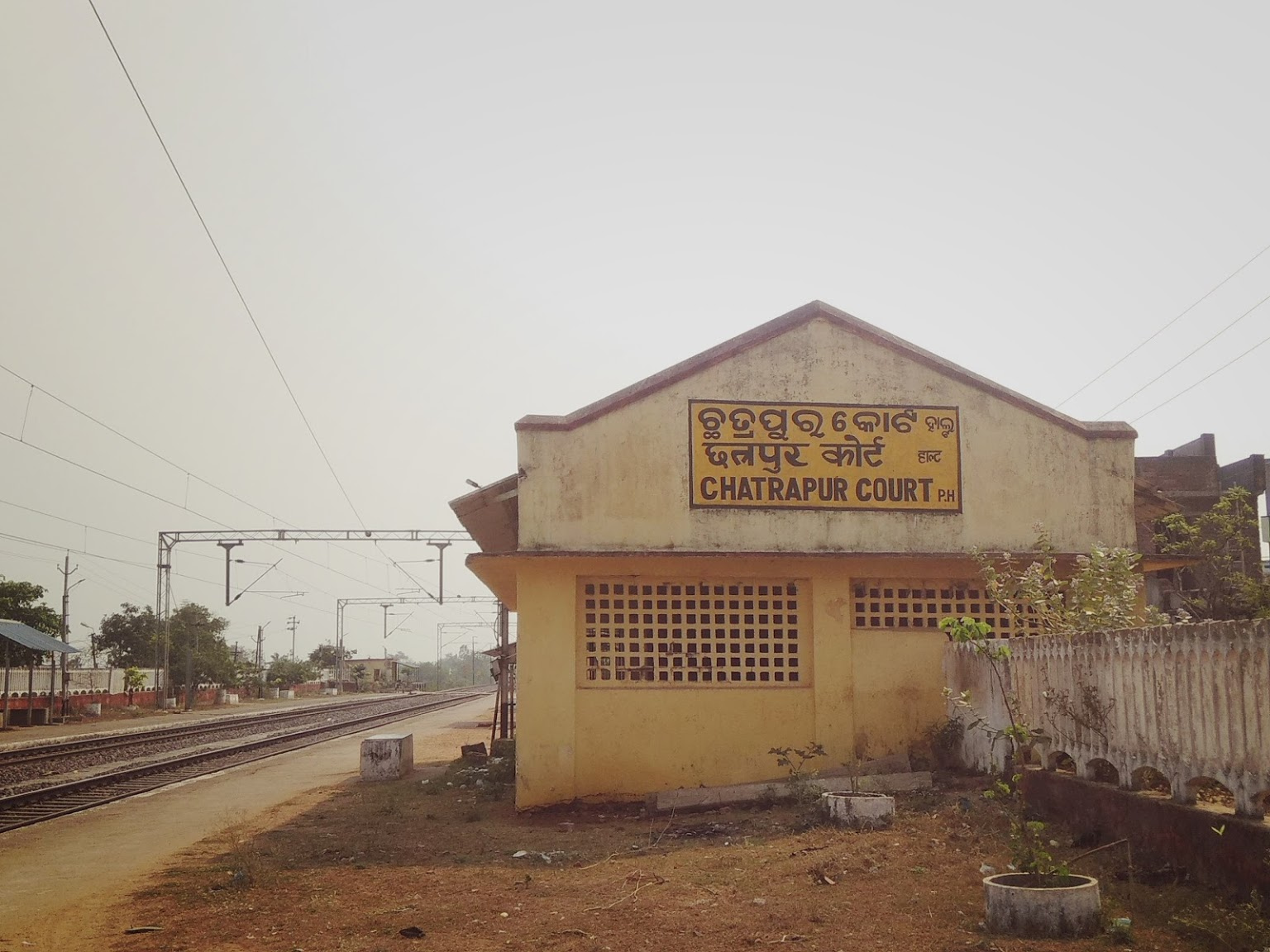

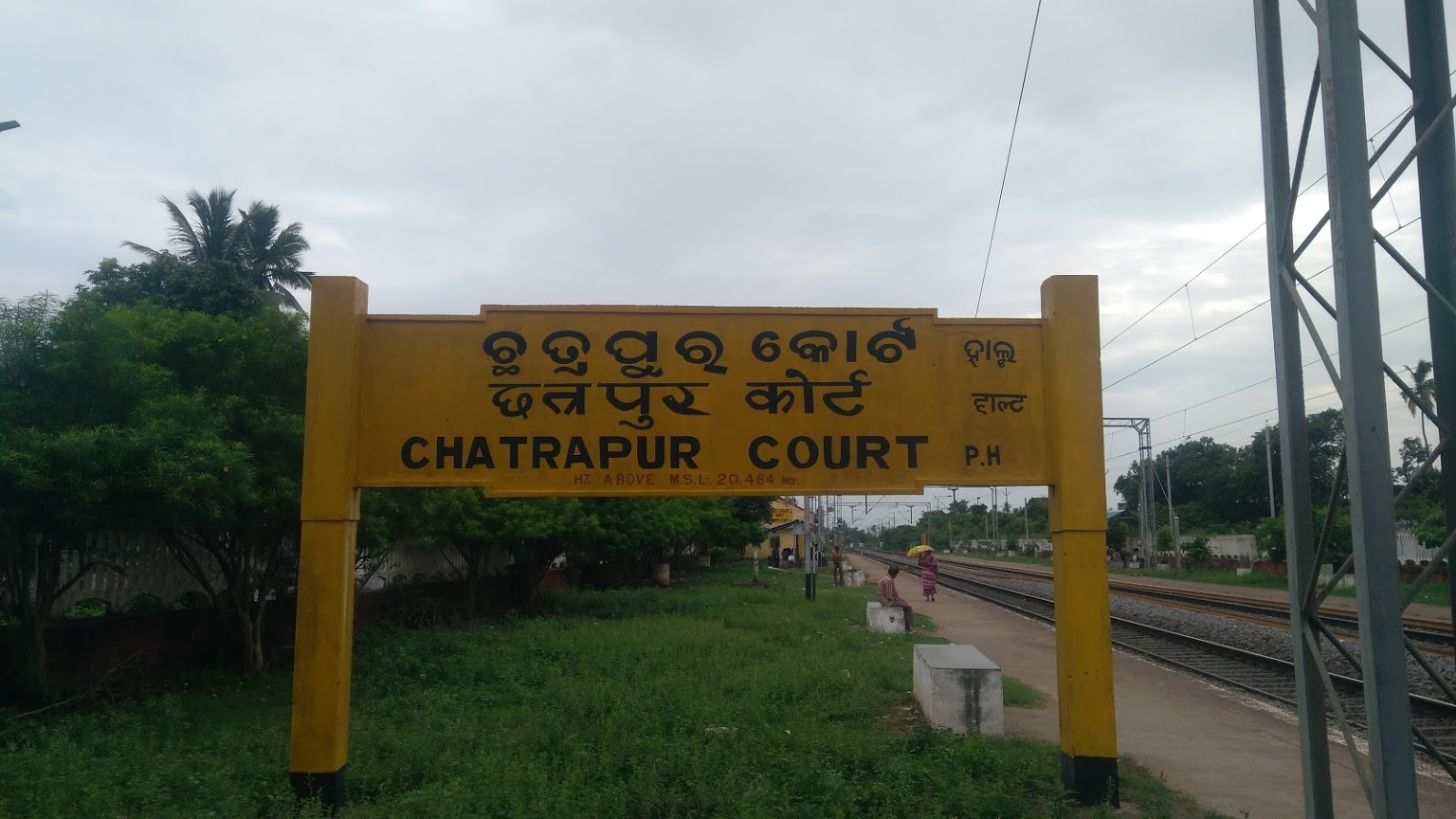

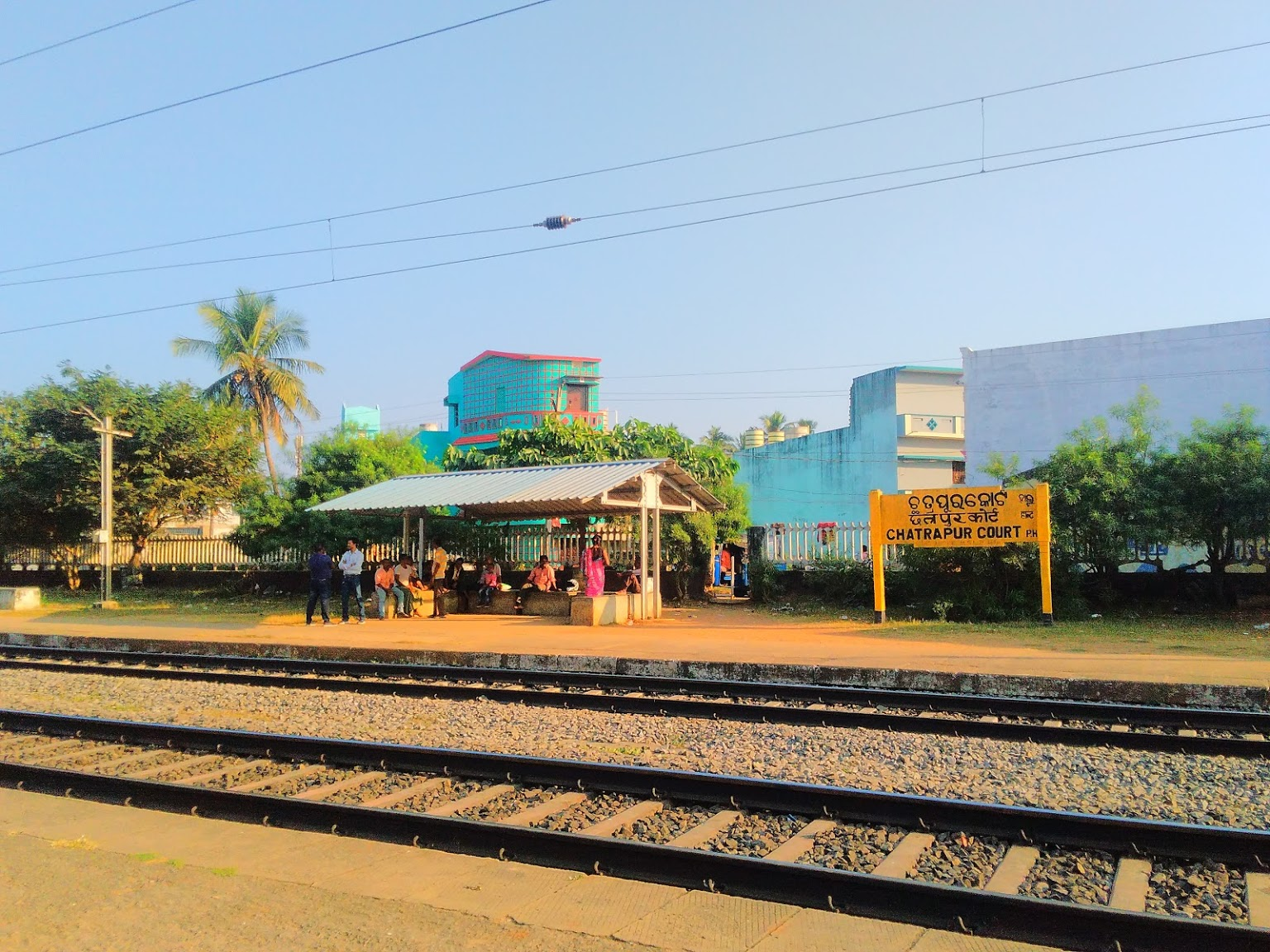
