= Belpahar railway station =

Railway station in Odisha, India

Belpahar

General information
- Location: Belpahar, Odisha; India
- Coordinates: 21°49′39″N 83°50′55″E
- System: Indian Railways station
- Owner: Ministry of Railways, Indian Railways
- Line: Tatanagar–Bilaspur section
- Platforms: 2
- Tracks: 2

Construction
- Structure type: Standard (on ground)
- Parking: No

Other information
- Status: Functioning
- Station code: BPH
- Zone(s): South East Central Railway
- Division(s): Bilaspur
Location
- Location within India Location within Odisha

Belpahar railway station is a main junction on the South East Central Railway network in the state of Odisha, India. It serves Belpahar city. Its code is BPH. It has two platforms. Passenger, Express and Superfast trains halt at Belpahar Junction.

== Trains ==
- Shalimar–Lokmanya Tilak Terminus Express
- Kalinga Utkal Express
- Lokmanya Tilak Terminus–Bhubaneswar Superfast Express
- Jharsuguda - Gondia MEMU Speciaal
- Titlagarh-Bilaspur Passenger Speciaal

== See also ==
- Jharsuguda district
