= Surla =

- Coordinates: 19°07′47″N 84°45′02″E
- Country: India
- State: Odisha
- District: Ganjam

Surla is a village in Chikti Block of Ganjam district, Odisha, India at the Andhra Pradesh-Odisha border on National Highway 5. It sits across from Ichchapuram, in Andhra Pradesh. There is a railway station named Surla Road on the Howrah-Chennai main line near Surabaya, and a Primary Health Center just outside the village.

The Surla Road railway station is adjacent to a small mountain called Govardhangiri which is around 8 km (5.0 mi) from the main village. People in the surrounding villages believe that this is the same hill that Lord Krishna lifted up to give shelter and protect the herd of cattle from the fury of a storm created by Indra, the king of Devatas. People from Girisola, a nearby village, worship Krishna and Indra at a small pool of water ( which never dries) in the crevice of a big boulder on the hill. Perhaps this is the only place in the country where Indra Puja is carried out.

A road branches off from the national highway at Surla railway station. This beautiful road leads to Chikiti( ancient Svetaka) town. The temple of Bala Kumari ( a form of Durga) is located on a hill near here. One can go by car up to the hill top.

Sunapur (literally "golden village", in Oriya, the local language) is a small village of fishermen is one mile from Surla village. Bahuda, an ancient river, flows into the Bay of Bengal here. Visitors have to cross the mouth of the river to enjoy the vast golden sands of the quiet beach. The government of Odisha is developing this beach into a tourist spot. Berhampur (now renamed 'Brahmapur') is the nearest city with fairly good facilities to stay is 15 miles (24 km) away. Taxi and Odisha state bus services are available from here to go to Surla and Sunapur.
