= Brahmapur railway station =

Railway station in Odisha, India

Brahmapur
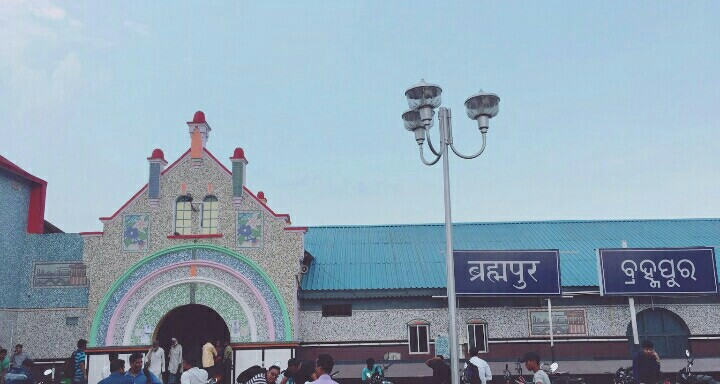
- Brahmapur station main entrance

General information
- Location: Brahmapur, Odisha, PIN-760001; India
- Coordinates: 19°17′48″N 84°47′48″E
- Elevation: 43 m (141 ft)
- System: Popularity rail and A Grade railway station
- Owner: Indian Railways
- Operator: Indian Railways
- Lines: Howrah-Chennai main line, Khurda Road–Visakhapatnam section
- Platforms: 4
- Tracks: 5
- Connections: Taxi stand, Auto stand, Bus stand, Availability of wheel chair system& High-speed Rail wire WiFi system provided by RailTel (Govt.of India)

Construction
- Structure type: Standard (on-ground station)
- Parking: Available
- Accessible: Disabled access

Other information
- Status: Functioning
- Station code: BAM
- Zone(s): East Coast Railway zone
- Division(s): Khurda Road
- Classification: Non-Suburban Grade-2 (NSG-2)

History
- Opened: 1896; 130 years ago
- Former names: East Coast State Railway, Bengal Nagpur Railway

Passengers
- 11958+

Services
Preceding station	Indian Railways	Following station
Jagannathpur towards Howrah Junction	East Coast Railway zone Khurda Road–Visakhapatnam section of Howrah–Chennai main line	Golanthra towards Chennai Central
Location
- Location within Odisha Location within India

Brahmapur railway station is a major and the oldest railway station in the Indian state of Odisha. Brahmapur well known as “The Silk City", is a city on the eastern coastline of the state of Odisha. Brahmapur Railway Station is one of the oldest Railway Station and it is administered under Khurda Road railway division of East Coast Railway zone. This station is classified as Non-Suburban Grade-2 (NSG-2) Category Station earlier categorized as ‘A’ category station. An average foot fall of 12,000 nos. are dealt here on daily basis. It is one of the major hub for Education & Business (food and garment) and railway provide hassle-free connectivity to this place. Brahmapur is famous for its tourist attraction. Tara Tarini an ancient Shakti peetha, Breast shrine of Adi Shakti and one amongst the 4 major Shakti Peeethas in India is 25 km from the city. In addition, the world famous Gopalpur-on-Sea sea beach, Bhairabi & MahuriKalia temples, and Tampara lake are around 10 km from the city. The famous Chilika Lake at Rambha and Taptapani Hot Springs are around 45 km from the city. It is silk city so silk products are cheap and readily available. This place is also famous for a variety of pickles, mixtures and papad.

== History ==
During the period of 1893 to 1896, (1,287 km (800 mi) of East Coast State Railway) this historic Brahmapur station was built and opened to traffic in 1896. Bengal Nagpur Railway's line to Brahmapur (Berhampur) was opened on 1 January 1899.

The 514 km (319 mi) long northern section of the South Eastern Railway was merged with BNR in 1902.

== Railway reorganization ==
The Bengal Nagpur Railway was nationalized in 1944.Eastern Railway was formed on 14 April 1952 with the portion of East Indian Railway Company east of Mughalsarai and the Bengal Nagpur Railway. In 1955, South Eastern Railway was carved out of Eastern Railway. It comprised lines mostly operated by BNR earlier. Amongst the new zones started in April 2003 were East Coast Railway and South East Central Railway. Both these railways were carved out of South Eastern Railway.

== Accessibility ==
- Distance from City Bus Stand 3 kilometres (1.9 mi)
- Distance from New Bus Stand(Haldiapadar) 5 kilometres (3.1 mi)
- Distance from MKCG Hospital 3 kilometres (1.9 mi)
- Distance from Berhampur University 11 kilometres (6.8 mi)
- Distance from Army AD College 14 kilometres (8.7 mi)
- Distance from Gopalpur Sea Beach 16 kilometres (9.9 mi)
- Distance from Sonapur Sea Beach 31 kilometres (19 mi)
- Distance from Khallikote University1.5 kilometres (0.93 mi)
- Distance from Tampara Lake 25 kilometres (16 mi)

The nearest international airport is Biju Patnaik International Airport (172 km)

== Gallery ==
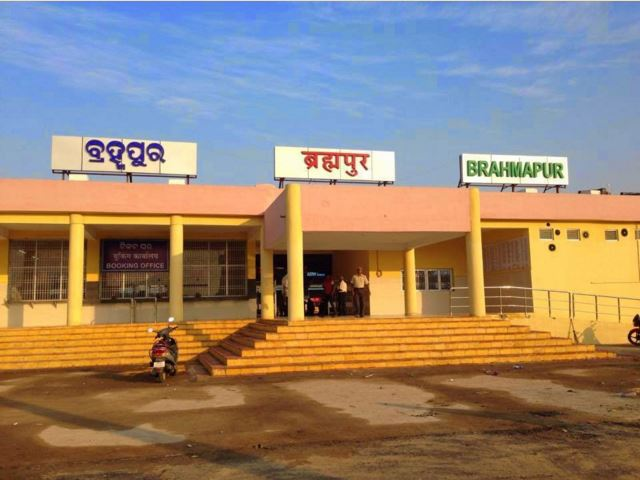
Newly inaugurated entrance and booking office

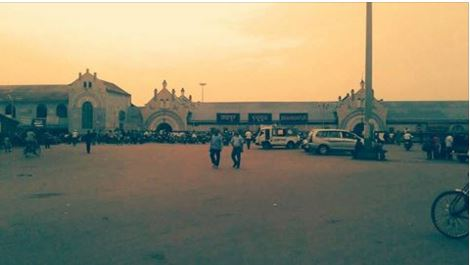
Early morning at Brahmapur railway station

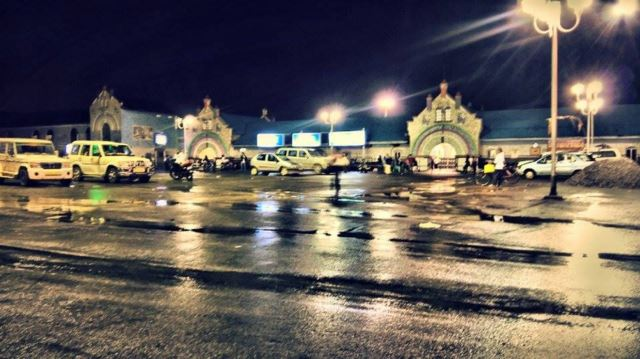
Brahmapur railway station on a rainy day

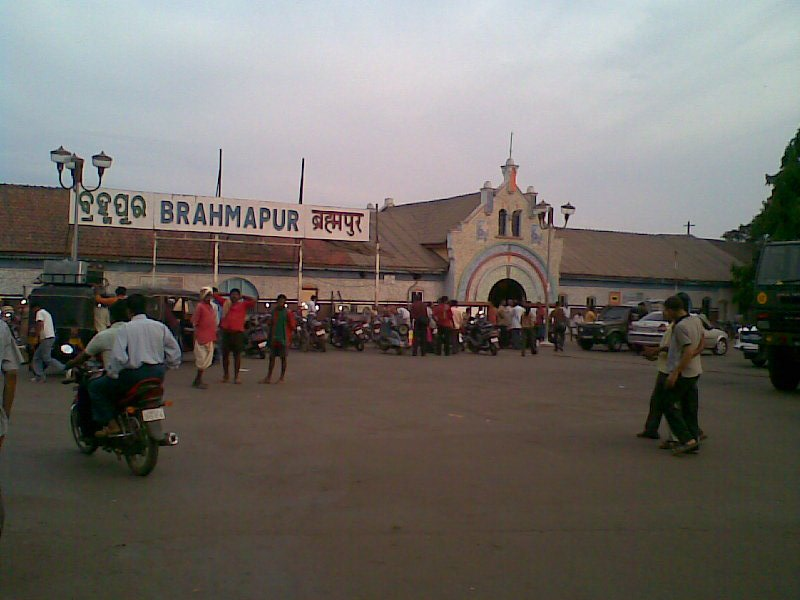
Railway station at dusk

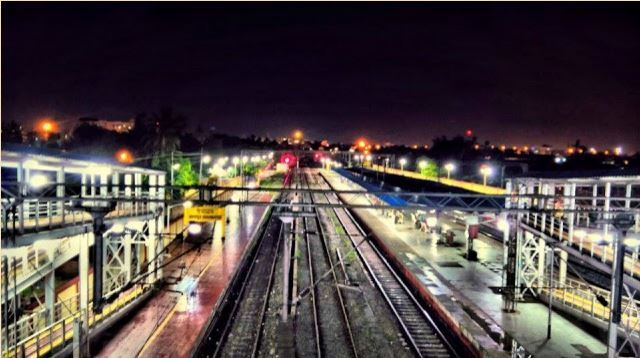
View from foot overbridge on a rainy day
