= Odisha Sampark Kranti Express =

Train in India

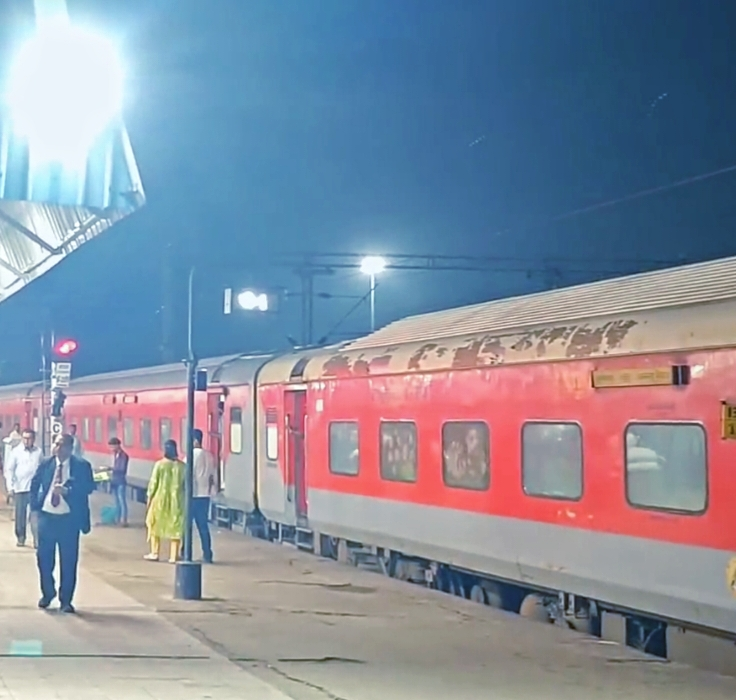
- Odisha Sampark Kranti Express Arrived At Prayagraj Junction

Overview
- Service type: Sampark Kranti Express
- Locale: Odisha, West Bengal, Jharkhand, Uttar Pradesh & Delhi
- First service: 11 March 2005; 21 years ago
- Current operator: East Coast Railway

Route
- Termini: Bhubaneswar (BBS); Anand Vihar Terminal (ANVT)
- Stops: 13
- Distance travelled: 1,784 km (1,109 mi)
- Average journey time: 27 hours 55 minutes
- Service frequency: Bi-weekly
- Train number: 12819 / 12820

On-board services
- Classes: AC First Class, AC 2 Tier, AC 3 Tier, Sleeper Class, General Class
- Seating arrangements: Yes
- Sleeping arrangements: Yes
- Catering facilities: Available
- Observation facilities: Large Windows
- Baggage facilities: No
- Other facilities: Below the seats

Technical
- Rolling stock: LHB coach
- Track gauge: 1,676 mm (5 ft 6 in)
- Operating speed: 130 km/h (81 mph) maximum, 65 km/h (40 mph) average including halts.
Route map
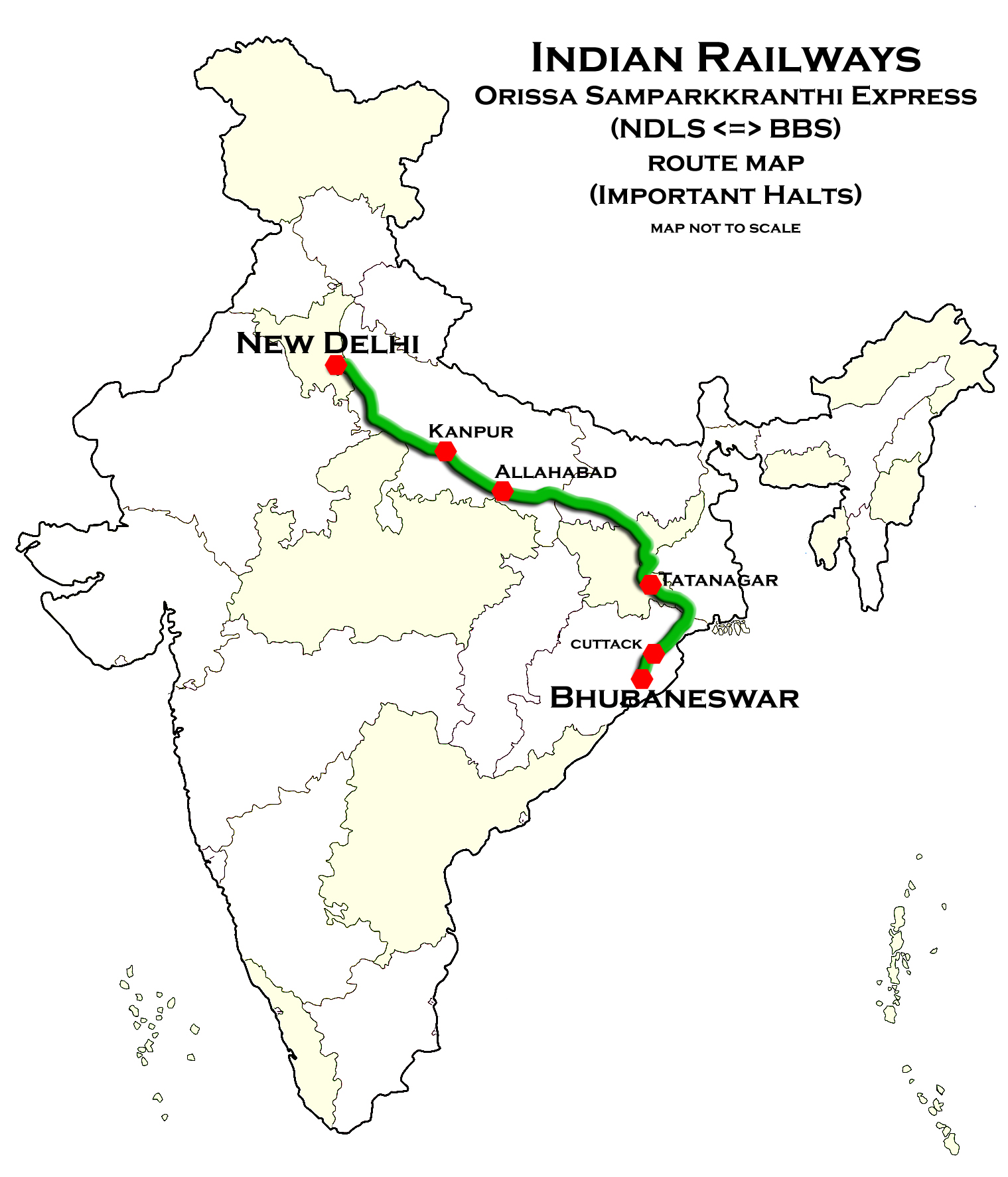

The 12819 / 12820 Odisha Sampark Kranti Express is a superfast express train which runs between Bhubaneswar, capital of Odisha and Anand Vihar Terminal. This train was introduced as part of the Sampark Kranti trains that were announced by the then railway minister Nitish Kumar in 2005. It was and still is a bi-weekly train. Earlier the train used to terminate at New Delhi railway station (NDLS) but now terminates at Anand Vihar Terminus (ANVT) of New Delhi. Its rakes are maintained by East Coast Railway (ECoR).

In 2019, Odia people protested demanding the extension of the Sampark Kranti Express till Berhampur. A PIL was also filed.

== Rake composition ==
This train consists of 1 First AC, 1 AC 2-Tier coach, 6 AC 3-Tier coaches, 7 Sleeper coaches, 2 General coaches,1 Pantry Car, 1 Divyang-cum-Guard Coach and 1 EOG coach. Hence making it a 20 Coach Train.

Loco	1	2	3	4	5	6	7	8	9	10	11	12	13	14	15	16	17	18	19	20
	SLRD	GEN	S1	S2	S3	S4	S5	S6	S7	PC	B1	B2	B3	B4	B5	B6	A1	H1	GEN	EOG

== Stoppage ==
It runs, from Anand Vihar Terminal via Kanpur Central, Pt. Deendayal Upadhyay Jn., Netaji SC Bose Junction (Gomoh), Tatanagar Junction, Hijili, Balasore, Bhadrak, Jajpur Keonjhar Road, Cuttack Junction to Bhubaneswar.

== Loco link ==
As the route is fully electrified. this train gets a WAP-7 locomotive of Itarsi Shed end to end.
