= Santragachi Junction railway station =

Railway Station in West Bengal, India

Santragachi Junction
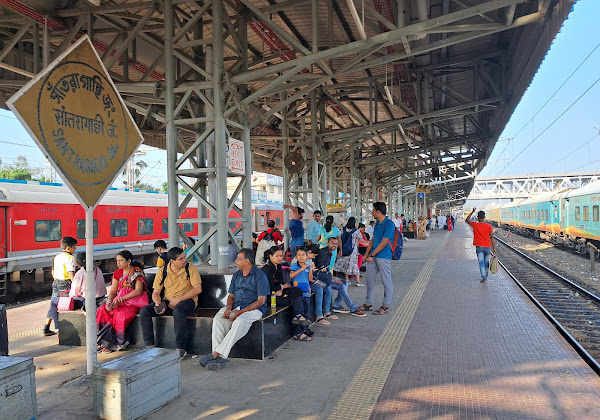

General information
- Location: Santragachi station Rd, Santragachi; Howrah, West Bengal - 711111; India
- Coordinates: 22°35′04″N 88°16′59″E
- Elevation: 12 metres (39 ft)
- Owner: Indian Railways
- Operator: South Eastern Railways
- Lines: Howrah–Kharagpur, Howrah–Amta, Santragachi–Shalimar
- Platforms: 8
- Tracks: 22
- Connections: Kona Expressway; Santragachi Bus Terminus; Taxi Stand

Construction
- Structure type: At grade
- Parking: Yes
- Accessible: Yes

Other information
- Status: Active
- Station code: SRC
- Zone(s): South Eastern Railway
- Division(s): Kharagpur

History
- Opened: 1900; 126 years ago
- Electrified: 1968; 58 years ago
- Former names: Bengal Nagpur Railway

Services
| Preceding station | Kolkata Suburban Railway | Following station |
|---|---|---|
| Mourigram towards Midnapore | South Eastern Line Main line & Santragachi–Amta branch line | Ramrajatala towards Howrah Junction |
| Bankranayabaz towards Amta | South Eastern Line Main line & Santragachi–Amta branch line | Padmapukur towards Shalimar |
Route map
- Source: Google Maps
Location
- Location within Kolkata Location within West Bengal Location within India
- Interactive map of Santragachi Junction

Santragachi Junction railway station (SRC) is a railway junction in South Eastern Railway Zone of Indian Railways, situated in Santragachhi, Howrah, India. The station is operated by the South Eastern Railway (SER) zone of Indian Railways. It is one of the important railway station serving the Kolkata metropolitan region, India. The other stations are Sealdah, Howrah, Shalimar, Dankuni and Kolkata station.

While the station had existed for many years on the line to Howrah railway station, work for its upgrade to a railway terminal started in 2015. SER wished to use it for their long-distance trains which reduces the load on the crowded Howrah railway station, which is operated by Eastern Railway.

Postal Jurisdiction: Santragachi Junction Railway Station falls under the delivery jurisdiction of Jagacha Sub Post Office (PIN Code: 711111), and not Santragachi Sub Post Office (PIN Code: 711104).

== Major Trains ==
Major trains available from Santragachi railway station are as follows:

- Santragachi–Chennai Central AC Superfast Express (22807/22808)
- Shalimar–Secunderabad AC Superfast Express (12773/12774)
- Santragachi–Pune Humsafar Express (20821/20822)
- Santragachi - Jabalpur Humsafar Express (20827/20828)
- Santragachi–Rani Kamalapati Humsafar Express (22169/22170)
- Santragachi–Tirupati Express (22855/22856)
- Santragachi–Mangaluru Central Vivek Express (22851/22852)
- Santragachi - Porbandar Kavi Guru Express (12949/12950)
- Santragachi - Tambaram Amrit Bharat Express (16107/16108)
- Santragachi - Purulia Rupashi Bangla Express (12883/12884)
- Santragachi–Anand Vihar Superfast Express (22857/22858)
- Santragachi–Ajmer Weekly Express (18009/18010)
- Santragachi - Hazur Sahib Nanded Express (12767/12768)
- Howrah–Barbil Jan Shatabdi Express (12021/12022)
- New Jalpaiguri - Digha Paharia Express (15721/15722)
- Shalimar–Chennai Central Superfast Express (22825/22826)
- Shalimar – Vasco da Gama Amaravati Express (18047/18048)
- Shalimar - Nagercoil Gurudev Express (12659/12660)
- Shalimar - Thiruvananthapuram Express (22641/22642)
- Shalimar - Hyderabad East Coast Express (18045/18046)
- Shalimar–Lokmanya Tilak Terminus Express (18029/18030)
- Shalimar - Puri Sri Jagannath Express (18409/18410)
- Shalimar - Bhojudih Aranyak Express (12885/12886)
- Shalimar - Lokmanya Tilak Terminus Samarsata Express (12151/12152)
- Shalimar - Lokmanya Tilak Terminus Jnaneswari Express (12101/12102)
- Shalimar - Visakhapatnam Superfast Express (22853/22854)
- Shalimar - Sambalpur Mahima Gosain Express (20831/20832)
- Shalimar - Badampahar Express (18049/18050)
- Shalimar–Gorakhpur Express (15021/15022)
- Shalimar–Udaipur City Weekly Express (20971/20972)
- Shalimar–Porbandar Superfast Express (12905/12906)
- Shalimar–Bhuj Weekly Superfast Express (22829/22830)
- Shalimar - Okha Superfast Express (22905/22906)
- Shalimar - Puri Express (12887/12888)
- Shalimar - Puri Garib Rath Express (12881/12882)
- Shalimar - Sambalpur Superfast Express (22803/22804)
- Shalimar - Bhanjpur Simlipal Intercity Express (18007/18008)
- Howrah - Jagdalpur Samaleshwari Express (18005/18006)
- Howrah–Mumbai CSMT Mail (via Nagpur) (12809/12810)
- Howrah–Chennai Mail (12839/12840)
- Howrah - Hatia Kriya Yoga Express (18615/18616)
- Howrah - Digha Tamralipta Express (12857/12858)
- Howrah - Puri Dhauli Express (12821/12822)
- Howrah - Jamshedpur Steel Express (12813/12814)
- Howrah - Chennai Central Coromandel Express (12841/12842)
- Howrah–Mysore Express (22817/22818)
- Howrah - Mumbai CSMT Gitanjali Express (12859/12860)
- Howrah–Ahmedabad Superfast Express (12833/12834)
- Howrah - Digha Kandri Express (22897/22898)
- Howrah - Secunderabad Falaknuma Express (12703/12704)
- Howrah - Titlagarh Ispat Express (12871/12872)
- Howrah - Kantabanji Ispat Express (22861/22862)
- Howrah - Sir M Visvesvaraya Terminal Superfast Express (12863/12864)
- Santragachi–Tambaram Antyodaya Express (22841/22842)

== Incidents ==
In 2018 two people died due to a stampede at the railway station. According to The Hindu, the two were killed when a train hit them when they were crossing the railway tracks on foot.

== Electric Loco Shed, Santragachi ==
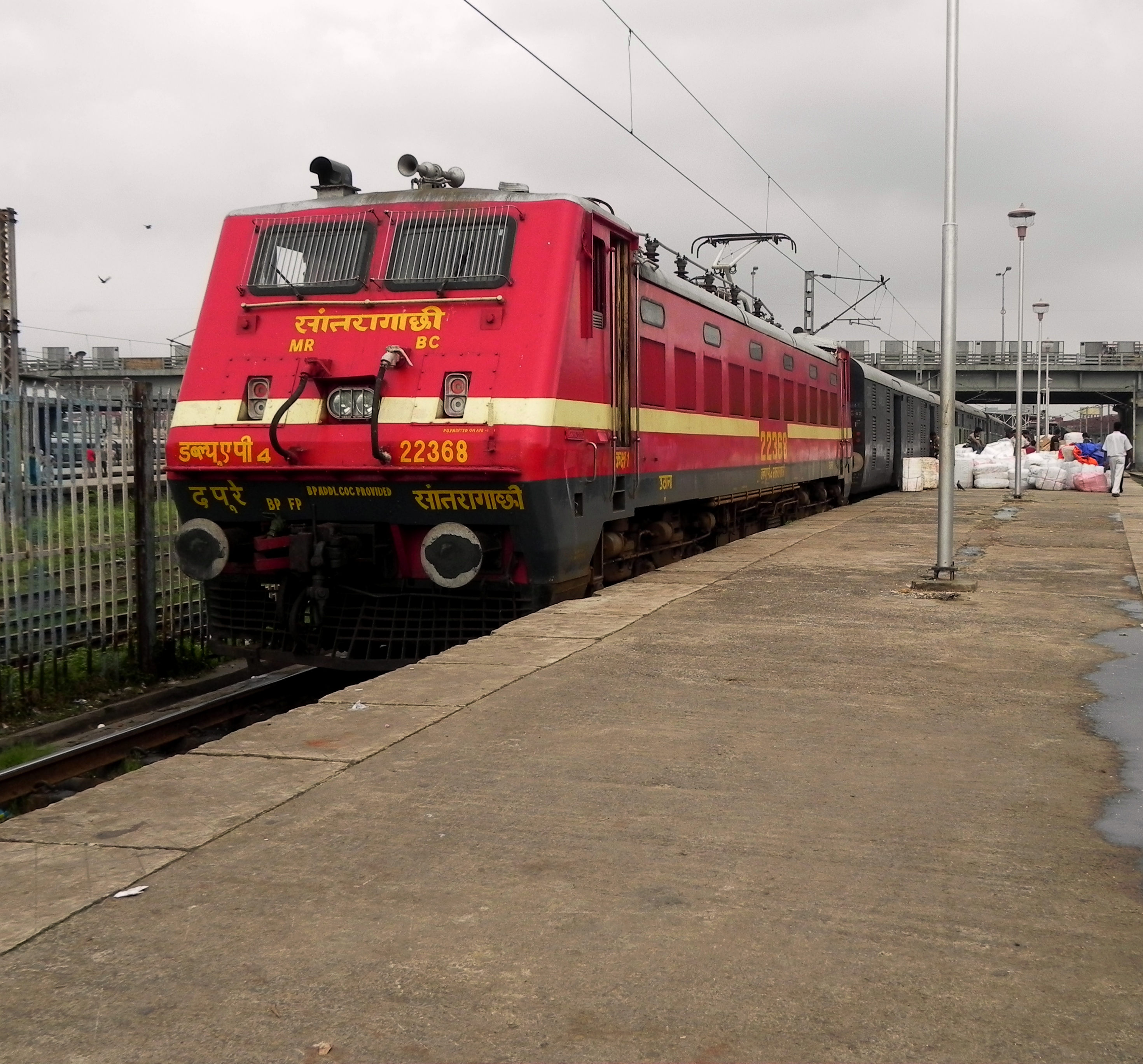
Santragachi based WAP-4 with East Coast Express at Howrah.

| SN | Type of loco | HP | Holding |
|---|---|---|---|
| 1. | WAP-4 | 5350 | 60 |
| 2. | WAP-7 | 6350 | 52 |
| Total locomotives active as of February 2026 | | | 112 |

== Gallery ==
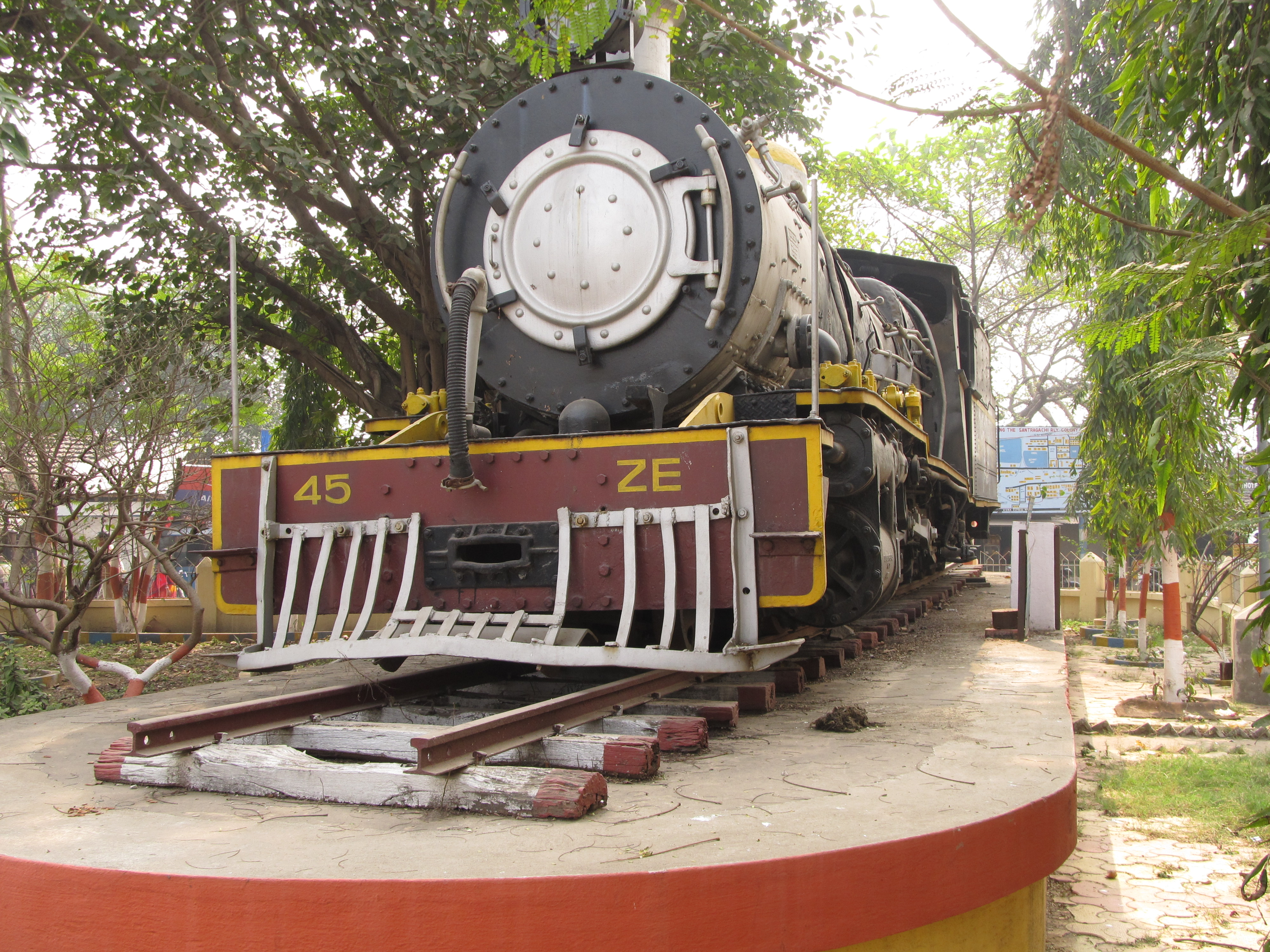
Narrow-gauge steam locomotive is preserved at Santragachi Railway Station

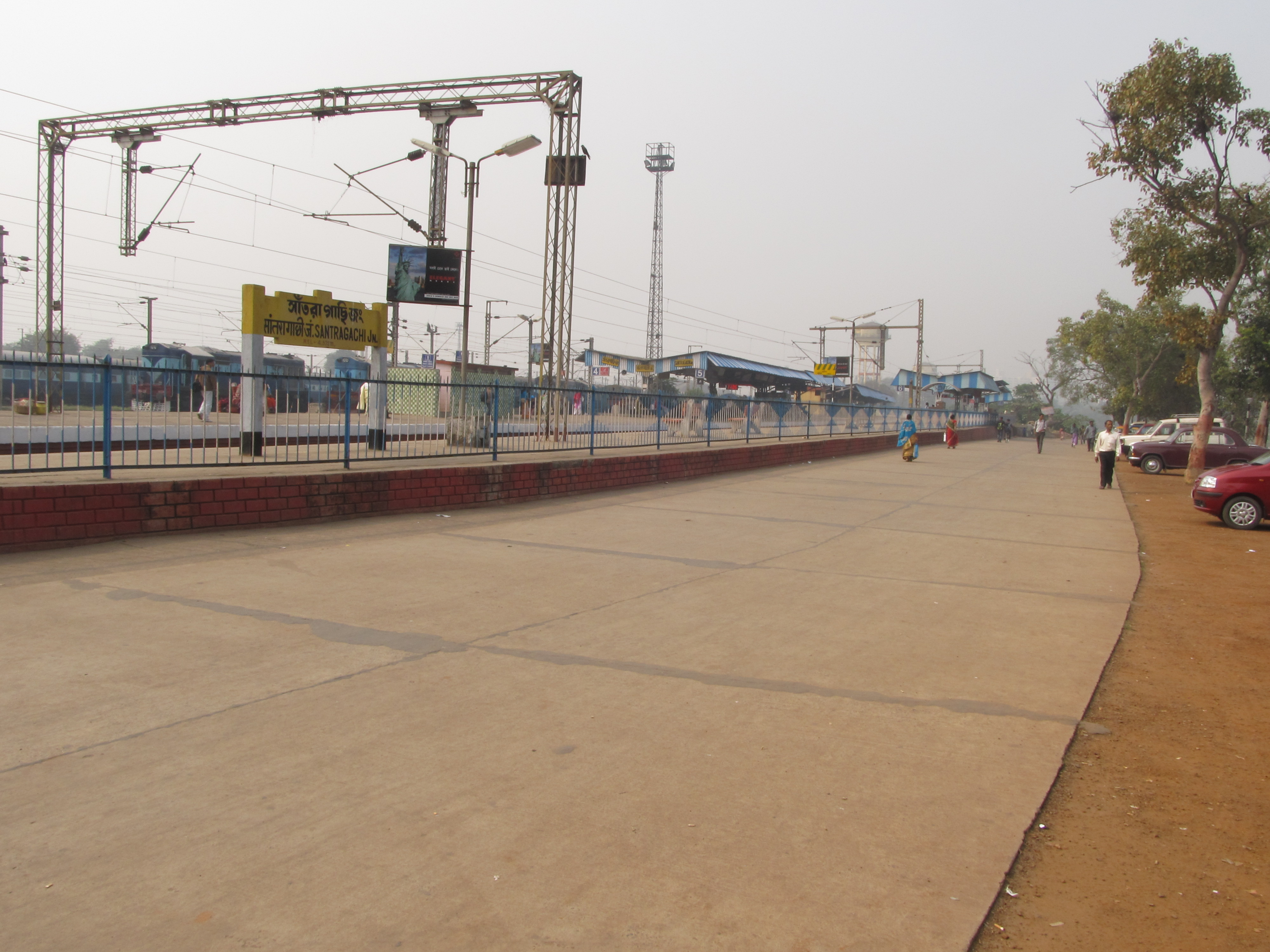
Santragachi railway station passenger terminal
