= Howrah–Mumbai CSMT Weekly Express =

Train in India

Overview
- Service type: Superfast
- Locale: West Bengal, Jharkhand, Odisha, Chhattisgarh & Maharashtra
- First service: 6 July 2006; 20 years ago
- Current operator: South Eastern Railway

Route
- Termini: Howrah Junction (HWH); Mumbai CSMT (CSMT)
- Stops: 19
- Distance travelled: 1,963 km (1,220 mi)
- Average journey time: 32 hrs 25 mins
- Service frequency: Weekly
- Train number: 12869 / 12870

On-board services
- Classes: AC 2 Tier, AC 3 Tier, AC 3 Tier Economy, Sleeper class, Unreserved/General
- Seating arrangements: Yes
- Sleeping arrangements: Yes
- Catering facilities: Available

Technical
- Rolling stock: LHB coach
- Track gauge: 1,676 mm (5 ft 6 in)
- Operating speed: 130 km/h (81 mph) maximum, 61 km/h (38 mph) average including halts.

The 12869 / 12870 Howrah–Mumbai CSMT Weekly Express is a passenger train service in India. It runs via Kharagpur, Tatanagar Junction, Chakradharpur, Bilaspur Junction, Raipur Junction, Gondia Junction, Nagpur Junction, Badnera Junction, Akola junction,Bhusaval Junction, Nashik Road and Kalyan Junction to reach Mumbai CSMT.

== Service ==
This train connects two metro cities of India – Mumbai and Kolkata. This train runs between Howrah and Mumbai CSMT. It is numbered as 12869/12870. It runs weekly. It departs from Howrah every Friday 02:05 PM and reach Mumbai CSMT every Saturday at 11:45 PM. On the reverse direction, it departs Mumbai CSMT every Sunday 11:05 AM to reach Howrah every Monday at 07:30 PM.

== Coach composition ==
The trains use modern LHB coach consisting of 2 AC two-tier coaches (2A), 5 AC three-tier coaches (3A), 3 AC three-tier economy coaches (M), 7 sleeper class coaches, 1 AC hot buffet car (pantry car), 2 general unreserved coaches, 1 divyangjan cum guard coach (SLRD), and 1 generator car.

Currently, it is also running with one high capacity parcel van.

Rake composition

Loco	1	2	3	4	5	6	7	8	9	10	11	12	13	14	15	16	17	18	19	20	21	22	23
	SLRD	GS	GS	S1	S2	S3	S4	S5	S6	S7	PC	B1	B2	B3	B4	B5	M1	M2	M3	A1	A2	EOG	HCPV

== Traction ==
It is hauled by a Santragachi-based WAP-7 locomotive end to end.
