= Tamralipta Express =

Train in India

Overview
- Service type: Superfast
- First service: 14 June 2009; 17 years ago
- Current operator: South Eastern Railway

Route
- Termini: Howrah (HWH); Digha (DGHA)
- Stops: 6
- Distance travelled: 185 km (115 mi)
- Average journey time: 3 hours 20 minutes
- Service frequency: Daily
- Train number: 12857 / 12858

On-board services
- Classes: General Unreserved, Chair Car, AC Chair Car
- Seating arrangements: Yes
- Sleeping arrangements: No
- Auto-rack arrangements: Overhead racks
- Catering facilities: Available
- Observation facilities: Large windows
- Baggage facilities: No
- Other facilities: Below the seats

Technical
- Rolling stock: LHB coach
- Track gauge: 1,676 mm (5 ft 6 in)
- Operating speed: 56 km/h (35 mph) average including halts.

The 12857 / 12858 Tamralipta Express is a superfast express train belonging to Indian Railways South Eastern Railway zone that runs between Howrah Junction and Digha in India.

It operates as train number 12857 from Howrah Junction to Digha and as train number 12858 in the reverse direction, serving the states of West Bengal.

== Background ==
This train is given on the name of Tamralipta which it was the name of a city in ancient India, located on the Bay of Bengal. The Tamluk town district headquarters of Purba Medinipur district, West Bengal in present-day is identified as the site of Tamralipti or Tamralipta.

== Coaches ==
The 12857 / 58 Tamralipta Express has 2 Sleeper, 1 3AC, 2 3AC Economy, 1 AC chair car, 5 Non-AC Chair car, 4 general unreserved & 2 SLR (seating with luggage rake) coaches. It carries a pantry car.

As is customary with most train services in India, coach composition may be amended at the discretion of Indian Railways depending on demand.

== Service ==
The 12857 Howrah Junction–Digha Tamralipta Express covers the distance of 185 km (115 mi) in 3 hours 20 mins (56 km/h) and in 3 hours 25 mins as the 12858 Digha–Howrah Junction Tamralipta Express (54 km/h).

As the average speed of the train is equal to 55 km/h (34 mph), as per railway rules, its fare includes a Superfast surcharge.

== Routing ==
The 12857 / 58 Tamralipta Express runs from Howrah Junction via Santragachi Junction, Mecheda, Tamluk Junction, Kanthi, Ramnagar to Digha.

== Schedule ==
=== 12857 ===
Runs daily

Station code	Station name	Time	Distance	Day
HWH	Howrah	6:35 AM	0 (source)	Day 1
SRC	Santragachi Junction	6:53 AM	8	Day 1
ULB	Uluberia	7:17 AM	33	Day 1
MCA	Mecheda railway station	7:38 AM	59	Day 1
TMZ	Tamluk Junction railway station	8:16 AM	92	Day 1
KATI	Kanthi railway Station	9:18 AM	153	Day 1
RMRB	Ramnagar Bengal railway station	9:44 AM	178	Day 1
DGHA	Digha	9:57 AM	186 (destination)	Day 1

=== 12858 ===
Runs daily

Station code	Station name	Time	Distance	Day
DGHA	Digha	10:25 AM	0 (source)	Day 1
RMRB	Ramnagar Bengal railway station	10:33 AM	9	Day 1
KATI	Kanthi railway Station	10:58 AM	33	Day 1
TMZ	Tamluk Junction railway station	11:58 AM	94	Day 1
MCA	Mecheda railway station	12:33 PM	127	Day 1
ULB	Uluberia	12:55 PM	154	Day 1
SRC	Santragachi Junction	1:17 PM	178	Day 1
HWH	Howrah	1:50 PM	186 (destination)	Day 1

== RSA ==
22897 / 98 Kandari Express

== Traction ==
As the route is electrified, a Santragachi Loco Shed-based WAP-4 or WAP-7 or Electric Loco Shed, Tatanagar based WAP-7 electric locomotive pulls the train to its destination.
