= Santragachi–Tirupati Express =

Train in India

Overview
- Service type: Superfast
- First service: 23 May 2011; 15 years ago
- Current operator: South Eastern Railway zone

Route
- Termini: Santragachi; Tirupati
- Stops: 16
- Distance travelled: 1,611 km (1,001 mi)
- Average journey time: 26 hours 17 mins
- Service frequency: Weekly
- Train number: 22855 / 22856

On-board services
- Classes: AC 2 tier, AC 3 tier, sleeper class, general unreserved
- Seating arrangements: Yes
- Sleeping arrangements: Yes
- Catering facilities: No

Technical
- Rolling stock: Standard Indian Railways Coaches
- Operating speed: 61.5 km/h (38 mph)
Route map
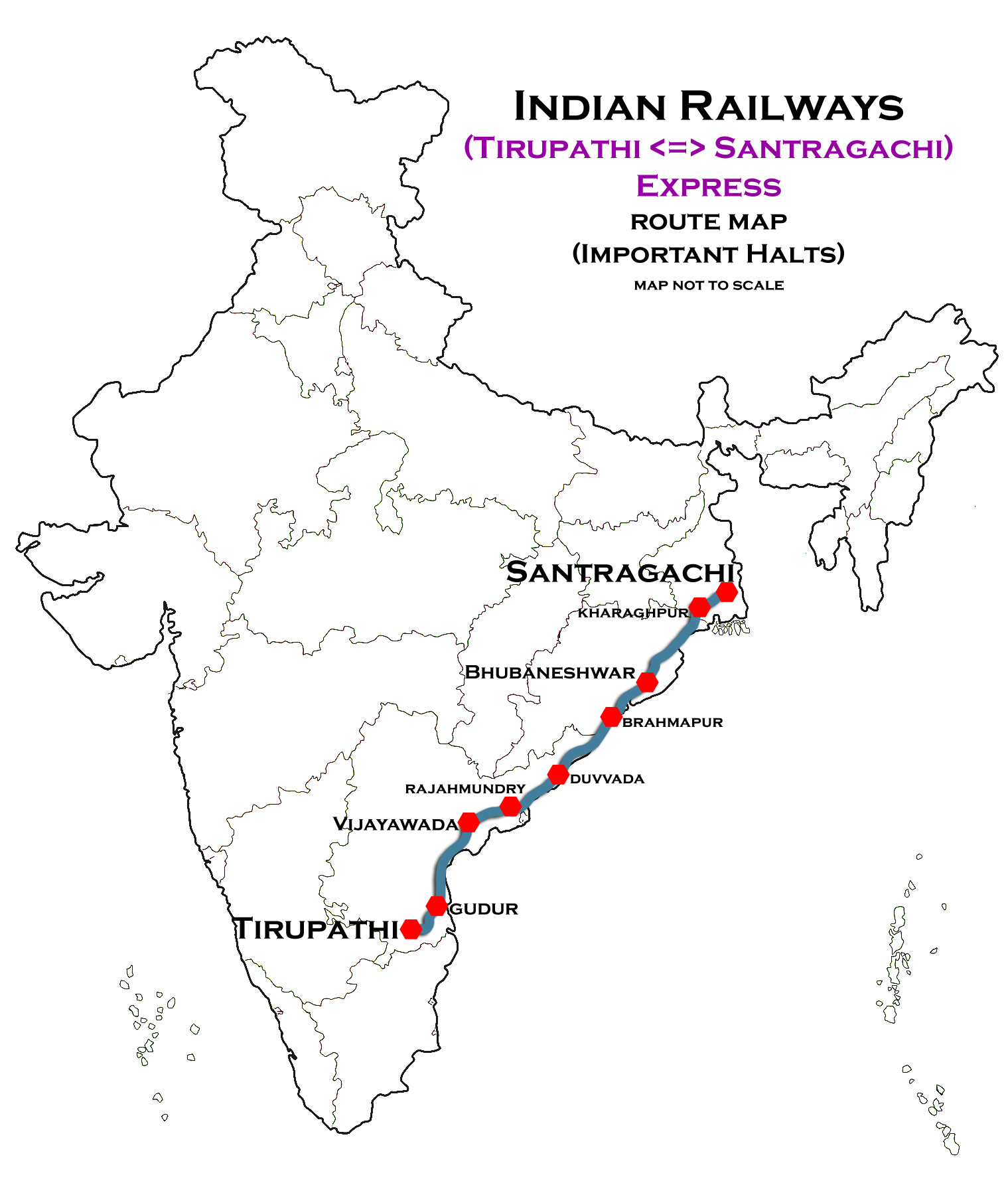

The 22855 / 56 Santragachi–Tirupati Express is a Superfast Express train belonging to Indian Railways East Coast Zone that runs between Santragachi and Tirupati in India.

It operates as train number 22855 from Santragachi to Tirupati and as train number 22856 in the reverse direction, serving the states of West Bengal, Odisha & Andhra Pradesh.

== Coaches ==
The 22855 / 56 Santragachi–Tirupati Express has one AC 2-tier, two AC 3-tier, eight sleeper class, six general unreserved & two SLR (seating with luggage rake) coaches. It does not carry a pantry car.

As is customary with most train services in India, coach composition may be amended at the discretion of Indian Railways depending on demand.

== Service ==
The 22855 Santragachi–Tirupati Express covers the distance of 1,611 km (1,001 mi) in 26 hours 10 mins (62 km/h) and in 26 hours 25 mins as the 22856 Tirupati–Santragachi Express (61 km/h).

As the average speed of the train is above 55 km/h (34 mph), as per railway rules, its fare includes a Superfast surcharge.

== Routing ==
The 22855 / 56 Santragachi–Tirupati Express runs from Santragachi via Kharagpur Junction, Khurda Road Junction, Visakhapatnam, Vijayawada Junction, Gudur Junction, Renigunta Junction to Tirupati.

== Traction ==
As the route is electrified, a Santragachi Junction-based WAP-4 electric locomotive pulls the train to its destination.
