= Howrah–Jodhpur Express =

Train in India

Howrah–Jodhpur/Bikaner Superfast Express
Overview
- Service type: Superfast
- Locale: West Bengal, Jharkhand, Bihar, Uttar Pradesh & Rajasthan
- First service: 3 July 1995; 31 years ago
- Current operator: Eastern Railway

Route
- Termini: Howrah (HWH); Jodhpur (JU)(Bikaner (BKN))
- Stops: 27
- Distance travelled: 1,815 km (1,128 mi)(1,886 km (1,172 mi))
- Average journey time: 29 hours (30 hrs 45 mins as Howrah-Bikaner-Howrah)
- Service frequency: 4 days a week (3 days as Howrah-Bikaner Superfast Express)
- Train number: 12307/12308 (22307/22308 Is Howrah-Bikaner Superfast Express)

On-board services
- Classes: AC First cum AC 2 Tier, AC 2 Tier, AC 3 Tier, Sleeper Class, General Unreserved
- Seating arrangements: Yes
- Sleeping arrangements: Yes
- Catering facilities: Available
- Observation facilities: Large windows
- Baggage facilities: Available
- Other facilities: Below the seats

Technical
- Rolling stock: LHB coach
- Track gauge: 1,676 mm (5 ft 6 in)
- Operating speed: 12307/08 – 63 km/h average including halts; 22307/08 – 61 km/h average including halts
Route map
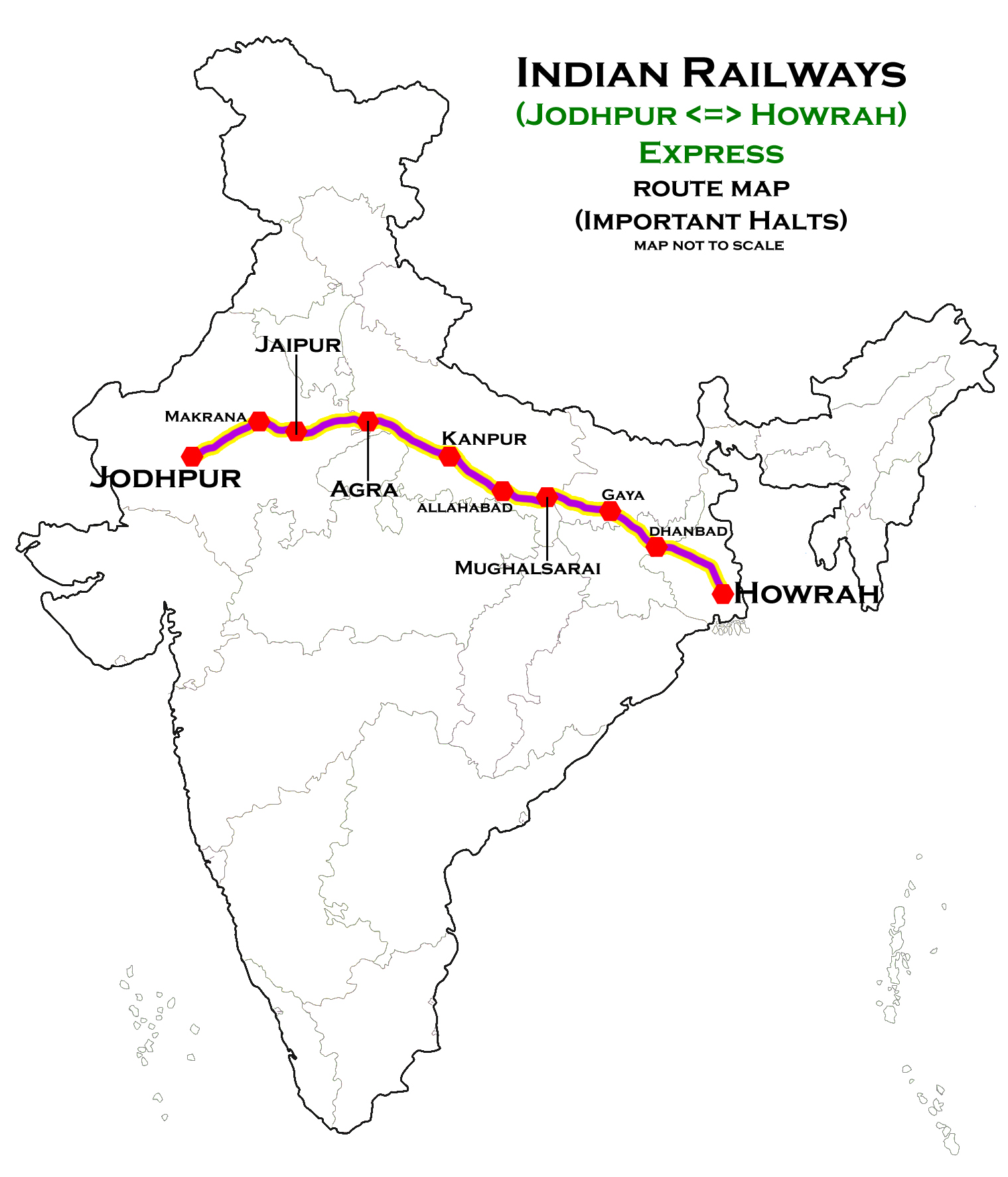

Howrah–Jodhpur/Bikaner Superfast Express is a superfast express train belonging to Indian Railways that runs between Howrah Junction and Jodhpur & Bikaner in India. It operates as train number 12307 from Howrah Junction to Jodhpur and as train number 12308 in the reverse direction. 4 days a week. It also runs as 22307/22308 Howrah-Bikaner Superfast Express 3 days a week. It gets a high priority on its route regularly. Also, it is the first train to have permission of running at 130 km/h during the first LHB inauguration in the Howrah Division.

== History ==
Broad Gauge Line reached Jaipur on 1992/1993. To connect Kolkata with Jaipur, on 20th June 1993, 2307/2308 Howrah- Jaipur Express was started. Abstract timings were 2307:- Howrah 23.45 pm; Bardhaman 01.17 am; Durgapur 02.13 am; Asansol 03.05 am; Dhanbad 04.13 am; Gaya 07.30 am; Mughalsarai 11.00 am; Allahabad 13.45 pm; Kanpur Central 16.55 pm; Tundla 20.30 pm; Agra Fort 21.25 pm; Sawai Madhopur 01.45 am; Jaipur 04.15 am. In return as 2308:- Jaipur 23.30 pm; Sawai Madhopur 01.55 am; Agra Fort 06.15 am; Tundla 07.05 am; Kanpur Central 10.45 am; Allahabad 13.55 pm; Mughalsarai 16.45 pm; Gaya 20.10 pm; Dhanbad 23.42 pm; Asansol 00.50 am; Durgapur 01.33 am; Bardhaman 02.30 am; Howrah 04.00 am. 2307/2308 Howrah-Jaipur Express was covering 1,622 kilometres (1,008 mi) in 28 hours 30 mins at 57 km/h (35 mph) speed. Then on 3rd July 1995, this service was extended to Jodhpur & Bikaner after Broad Gauge Line reached there in 1995. Timings in Jaipur-Jodhpur were 2307:- Jaipur 04.15 am; Merta Road Jn. 07.30/08.00; Jodhpur 10.00. Timings in Jaipur-Bikaner were 2307A:- Jaipur 04.15 am; Merta Road Jn. 07.30/08.20; Bikaner 11.30. Return timings were Jodhpur 17.45; Merta Road Jn. 19.30/20.00; Jaipur 23.30 for 2308 & Bikaner 16.15; Merta Road Jn. 19.20/20.00, Jaipur 23.30 for 2308A. Both the train 2307/2308 & 2307A/2308A used this timetable until 2005 to cover Howrah-Jodhpur 1,932 kilometres (1,200 mi) in 34 hrs 15 mins at 56.40 km/h (35 mph) speed & to cover Howrah-Bikaner 2,003 kilometres (1,245 mi) in 35 hrs 45 mins at 56.03 km/h (35 mph) speed

in 2007 after Agra - Achhnera - Bharatpur - Bandikui line was made Broad Gauge Line from Meter Gauge, Sawai Madhopur lost this Howrah train. From 2007-2020, 2307/2308 & 2307A/2308A (later 12307/12308 & 22307/22308) timings were same in Howrah - Agra -Howrah part with slight speed up. Howrah 23.30 pm; Mughalsarai 10.35 am; Allahabad 12.55 pm, Kanpur 15.35 pm, Agra Fort 20.00 pm; Bharatpur 21.05 pm; Jaipur 00.30 am; Merta Road 04.20 am; Jodhpur 06.15 am for 12307 (Merta Road Jn. 04.40 am; Bikaner 07.45 for 22307). In return for 12308 was Jodhpur 21.15 pm; Merta Road Jn. 23.15;(for 22308 was Bikaner 20.00; Merta Road Jn. 23.15) Jaipur 02.50 am; Bharatpur 06.01 am; Agra Fort 07.05 am; Kanpur Central 11.30 am; Allahabad 14.20 pm; Mughalsarai 17.10 pm; Howrah 04.00 am. The train 12307/12308 was covering 1,815 kilometres (1,128 mi) in 30 hours 45 mins at 59 km/h (37 mph) speed & the train 22307/22308 was covering 1,886 kilometres (1,172 mi) in 32 hrs 00 mins at 58.93 km/h (37 mph). Merta Road Junction was the reversal & bifurcation/amalgamation point of 12307/08 & 22307/08 until 2020, the trains were separated & 22307/22308 started running via Merta Road Bypass(MTDB) station to avoid reversal.

== Current Service ==
The 12307 Howrah–Jodhpur Express covers the distance of 1,815 kilometres (1,128 mi) in 30 hours 00 mins at 60.50 km/h (38 mph) speed and in 29 hours as 12308 Jodhpur–Howrah Express at 63 km/h (39 mph) speed. 22307 Howrah-Bikaner Express covers the distance of 1,886 kilometres (1,172 mi) in 30 hrs 50 mins at 61.17 km/h (38 mph) speed and in 30 hrs 40 mins at 61.45 km/h (38 mph) speed. Earlier it was daily service & used to run combined in Howrah - Merta Road Jn. stretch of journey. Then at Merta Road Jn, 12307 used to separate towards Jodhpur & another part used to proceed to Bikaner as 12307A. Similarly in return 12308 coming from Jodhpur & 12308A coming from Bikaner, used to join at Merta Road Jn. for proceeding towards Howrah as a combined train. Merta Road Junction was the reversal & bifurcation/amalgamation point of 12307/08 & 22307/08 until 2020. This type of operation was stopped from 2020 after the COVID-19 period when Merta Road Bypass(MTDB) station to avoid reversal.

As the average speed of the train is more than 55 km/h, its fare includes a Superfast surcharge.

== 12307 Jodhpur Express ==
Station code	Station name	Arrival	Departure
HWH	Howrah Junction	---	23:30
BWN	Barddhaman Junction	00:22	00:24
ASN	Asansol Junction	02:05	01:55
DHN	Dhanbad Junction	03:13	03:23
PNME	Parasnath	04:06	04:08
KQR	Koderma Junction	04:58	05:00
GAYA	Gaya Junction	06:20	06:30
RFJ	Rafiganj	07:06	07:08
AUBR	Anugraha Narayan Road	07:26	07:28
DOS	Dehri On Sone	07:43	07:45
SSM	Sasaram Junction	08:00	08:02
BBU	Bhabua Road	08:42	08:44
DDU	Pt DD Upadhyaya Junction	09:40	09:55
MZP	Mirzapur	10:58	11:00
PRYJ	Prayagraj Junction	12:10	12:15
FTP	Fatehpur	13:35	13:37
CNB	Kanpur central	14:45	14:55
ETW	Etawah Junction	16:37	16:39
TDL	Tundla Junction	18:20	18:25
AF	Agra fort	19:05	19:15
AH	Achhnera Junction	19:44	19:46
BTE	Bharatpur Junction	20:12	20:17
JP	Jaipur Junction	23:35	23:55
NAC	Nawa City	01:18	01:20
KMNC	Kuchaman City	01:35	01:37
MKN	Makrana Junction	01:51	01:53
DNA	Degana Junction	02:33	02:35
MTD	Merta Road Junction	03:20	03:25
JU	Jodhpur Junction	05:20	---

== 12308 Howrah Express ==
Station code	Station name	Arrival	Departure
JU	Jodhpur Junction	---	23:55
MTD	Merta Road Junction	01:20	01:25
DNA	Degana Junction	02:10	02:12
MKN	Makrana Junction	02:52	02:54
KMNC	Kuchaman City	03:06	03:08
NAC	Nawa City	03:23	03:25
JP	Jaipur Junction	04:55	05:05
BTE	Bharatpur Junction	08:05	08:10
AH	Achhnera Junction	08:36	08:38
AF	Agra fort	09:05	09:15
TDL	Tundla Junction	09:54	09:59
ETW	Etawah Junction	11:20	11:22
CNB	Kanpur central	13:25	13:35
FTP	Fatehpur	14:41	14:43
PRYJ	Prayagraj Junction	16:10	16:15
MZP	Mirzapur	17:27	17:29
PaDDU	Pt DD Upadhyaya Junction	18:30	18:45
BBU	Bhabua Road	19:37	19:39
SSM	Sasaram Junction	20:21	20:23
DOS	Dehri On Sone	20:38	20:40
AUBR	Anugraha Narayan Road	20:55	20:57
RFJ	Rafiganj	21:15	21:17
GAYA	Gaya Junction	21:55	22:05
KQR	Koderma Junction	23:21	23:23
PNME	Parasnath	00:08	00:10
DHN	Dhanbad Junction	00:50	01:00
ASN	Asansol Junction	01:58	02:08
BWN	Barddhaman Junction	03:37	03:39
HWH	Howrah Junction	04:55	---

== 22307 Bikaner Express ==
Station code	Station name	Arrival	Departure
HWH	Howrah Junction	---	23:25
BWN	Barddhaman Junction	00:35	00:37
DGR	Durgapur	01.28	01:30
ASN	Asansol Junction	02:05	02:15
DHN	Dhanbad Junction	03:13	03:23
PNME	Parasnath	04:06	04:08
KQR	Koderma Junction	04:58	05:00
GAYA	Gaya Junction	06:20	06:30
RFJ	Rafiganj	07:06	07:08
AUBR	Anugraha Narayan Road	07:26	07:28
DOS	Dehri On Sone	07:43	07:45
SSM	Sasaram Junction	08:00	08:02
BBU	Bhabua Road	08:42	08:44
DDU	Pt DD Upadhyaya Junction	09:40	09:55
MZP	Mirzapur	10:58	11:00
PRYJ	Prayagraj Junction	12:10	12:15
FTP	Fatehpur	13:35	13:37
CNB	Kanpur central	14:45	14:55
ETW	Etawah Junction	16:37	16:39
TDL	Tundla Junction	18:20	18:25
AF	Agra fort	19:05	19:15
AH	Achhnera Junction	19:44	19:46
BTE	Bharatpur Junction	20:12	20:17
BKI	Bandikui Junction	Passing	22:07
JP	Jaipur Junction	23:35	23:45
NAC	Nawa City	01:11	01:13
KMNC	Kuchaman City	01:28	01:30
MKN	Makrana Junction	01:44	01:46
DNA	Degana Junction	02:26	02:28
MTDB	Merta Road Bypass	03:10	03:15
NGO	Nagaur	04:09	04:11
NOK	Nokha	04:56	04:58
DSO	Nokha	05:30	05:32
BKN	Bikaner Junction	06:15	---

== 22308 Howrah Express ==
Station code	Station name	Arrival	Departure
BKN	Bikaner Junction	---	22:15
DSO	Nokha	22:45	22:47
NOK	Nokha	23:17	23:19
NGO	Nagaur	00:53	00:58
MTDB	Merta Road Bypass	01:20	01:25
DNA	Degana Junction	02:10	02:12
MKN	Makrana Junction	02:52	02:54
KMNC	Kuchaman City	03:06	03:08
NAC	Nawa City	03:23	03:25
JP	Jaipur Junction	04:55	05:05
BKI	Bandikui Junction	Passing	06:27
BTE	Bharatpur Junction	08:05	08:10
AH	Achhnera Junction	08:36	08:38
AF	Agra fort	09:05	09:15
TDL	Tundla Junction	09:54	09:59
ETW	Etawah Junction	11:20	11:22
CNB	Kanpur central	13:25	13:35
FTP	Fatehpur	14:41	14:43
PRYJ	Prayagraj Junction	16:10	16:15
MZP	Mirzapur	17:27	17:29
PaDDU	Pt DD Upadhyaya Junction	18:30	18:45
BBU	Bhabua Road	19:37	19:39
SSM	Sasaram Junction	20:21	20:23
DOS	Dehri On Sone	20:38	20:40
AUBR	Anugraha Narayan Road	20:55	20:57
RFJ	Rafiganj	21:15	21:17
GAYA	Gaya Junction	21:55	22:05
KQR	Koderma Junction	23:21	23:23
PNME	Parasnath	00:08	00:10
DHN	Dhanbad Junction	00:50	01:00
ASN	Asansol Junction	01:58	02:08
DGR	Durgapur	02.41	02:43
BWN	Barddhaman Junction	03:37	03:39
HWH	Howrah Junction	04:55	---

== Traction ==
Both trains are hauled by a Howrah Loco Shed-based WAP-7 electric locomotive from Howrah to Jodhpur and vice versa.
