= Kriya Yoga Express =

Train in India

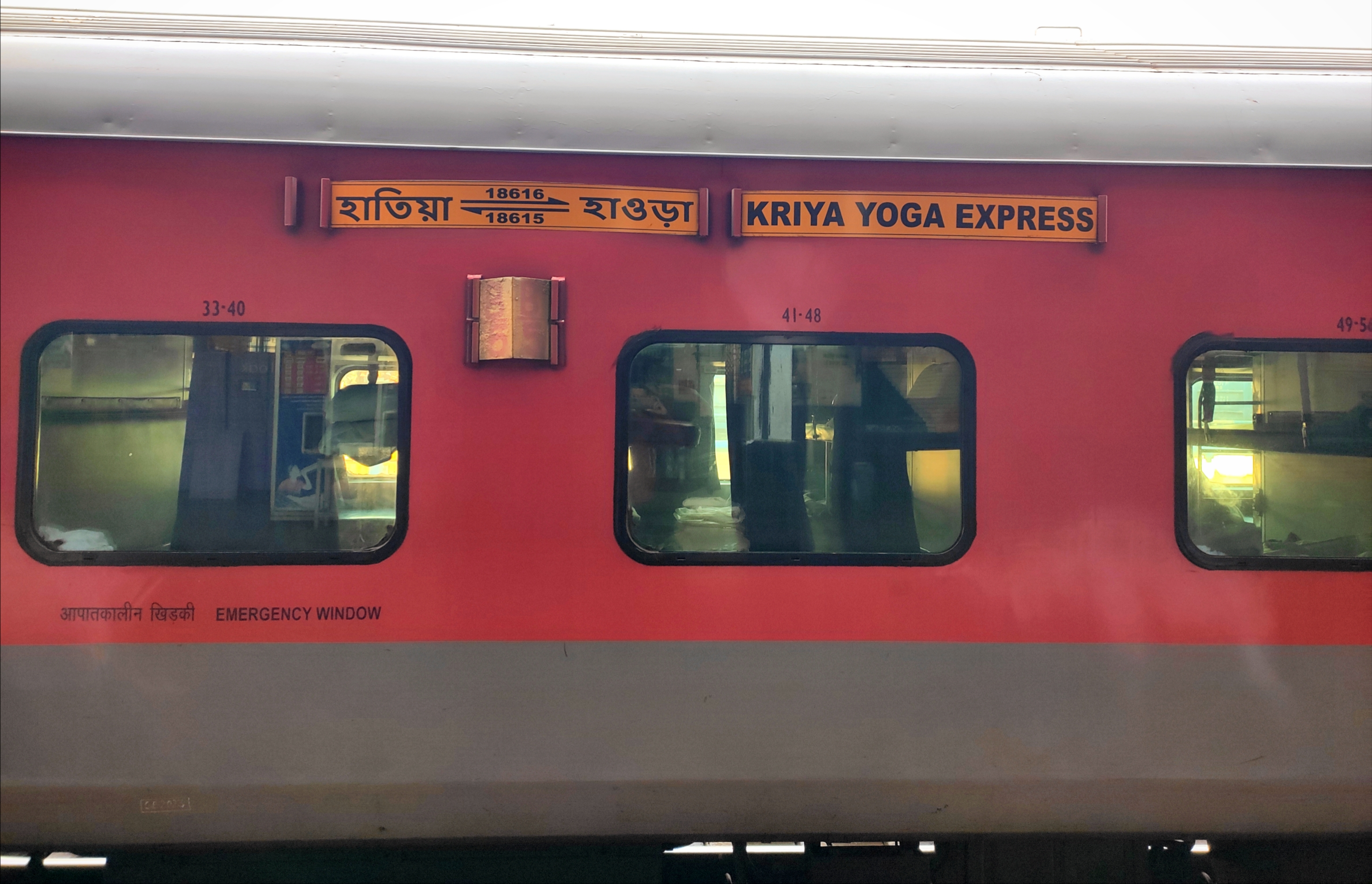

Overview
- Service type: Express
- Locale: West Bengal & Jharkhand
- First service: 1 October 1933; 92 years ago
- Current operator: South Eastern Railway

Route
- Termini: Howrah (HWH); Hatia (HTE)
- Distance travelled: 421 km (262 mi)
- Service frequency: Daily
- Train number: 18615 / 18616

On-board services
- Classes: AC First Class, AC 2 Tier, AC 3 Tier, AC 3 Tier Economy, Sleeper class, General Unreserved
- Seating arrangements: Yes
- Sleeping arrangements: Yes
- Catering facilities: On-board catering, E-catering
- Observation facilities: Large windows
- Baggage facilities: No
- Other facilities: Below the seats

Technical
- Rolling stock: LHB coach
- Track gauge: 1,676 mm (5 ft 6 in)
- Operating speed: 130 km/h (81 mph) maximum, 47 km/h (29 mph) average including halts

The 18615 / 18616 Kriya Yoga Express (formerly known as Howrah-Hatia Express), is an Express train of Indian Railways in India's South Eastern Railway zone that runs between Howrah Junction and Hatia, serving the Indian states of West Bengal and Jharkhand. It operates as train number 18615 from Howrah Junction to Hatia and as train number 18616 in the reverse direction.

On 21 June 2015, the first International Day of Yoga, the Kriya Yoga Express adopted this name to commemorate the contributions of Kriya Yoga master Paramahansa Yogananda in spreading the teaching and practice of yoga worldwide. This train had been instrumental in the life and spiritual journey of Paramahansa.

== Coaches ==
The 18615 / 16 Kriya Yoga Express presently has 1 AC First Class, 2 AC 2 Tier, 5 AC 3 Tier, 3 AC 3 Tier Economy, 8 Sleeper Class, and 2 EOG Coaches. One of the EOG Coach is used for Railway Mail Service. It does not carry a pantry car.

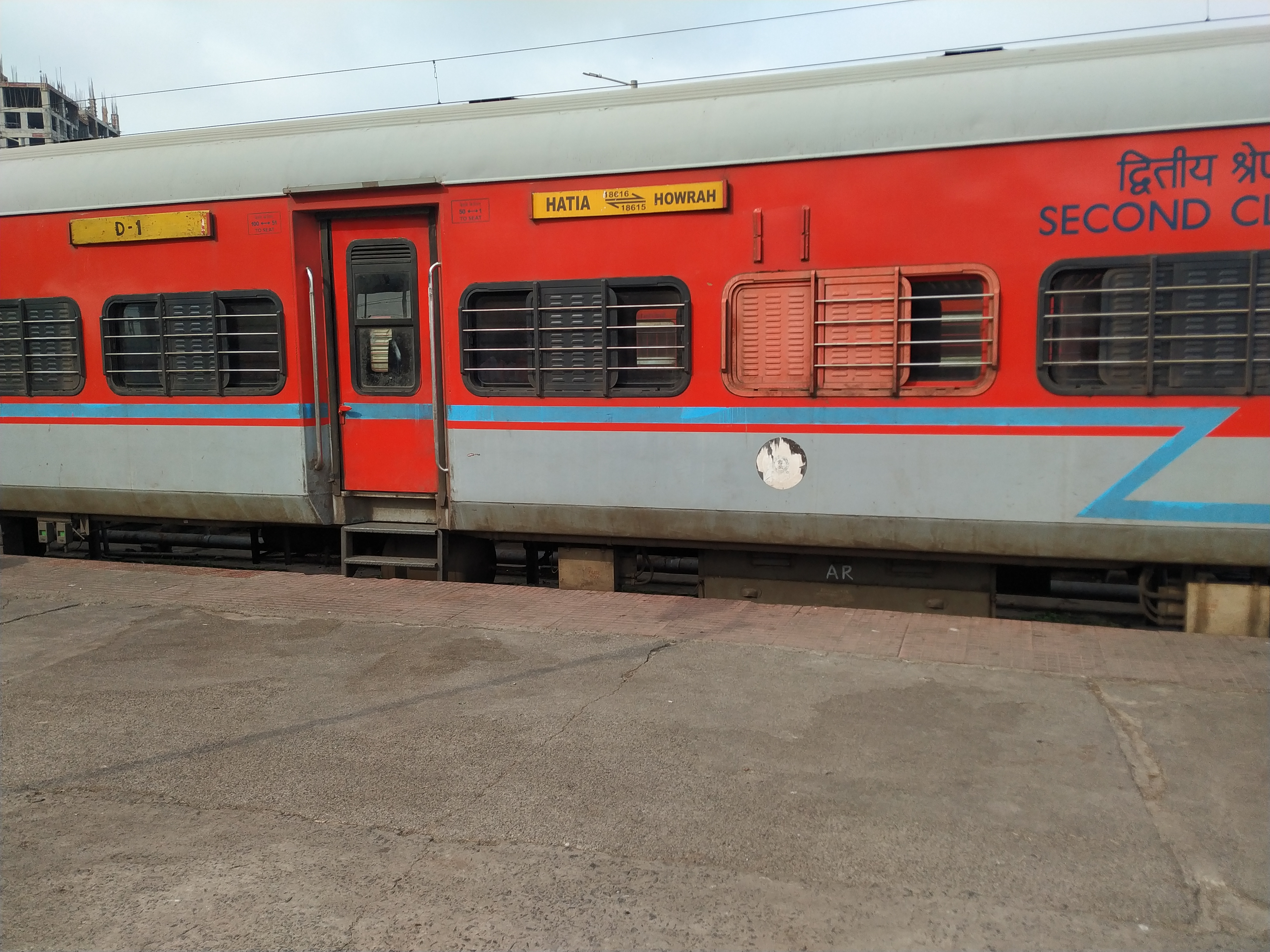
LHB coach of Kriya Yoga Express.

== Routeing ==
The 18615 / 16 Kriya Yoga Express runs from Howrah Junction via Kharagpur Junction, Tatanagar Junction, Muri Junction, Ranchi Junction to Hatia.

It reverses direction of travel at Muri Junction.

== Service ==
The 18615 Kriya Yoga Express covers the distance of 421 kilometres in 08 Hours 35 minutes (47km/h) and in 09 Hours 05 minutes as 18616 Hatia–Howrah Express (47km/h).

As the average speed of the train is below 55 km/h (34 mph), as per Indian Railways rules, its fare does not include a Superfast surcharge.

== Timings ==
18615 Kriya Yoga Express leaves Howrah Junction on a daily basis at 21:10 hrs IST and reaches Hatia at 06:50 hrs IST the next day.

18616 Kriya Yoga Express leaves Hatia on a daily basis at 21:20 hrs IST and reaches Howrah Junction at 07:20 hrs IST the next day.

== Traction ==
As the route is fully electrified, a Santragachi-based WAP-7 electric locomotive powers the train for its entire journey.
