= Kandari Express =

Train in India

Overview
- Service type: Superfast
- First service: 14 June 2009; 16 years ago
- Current operator: South Eastern Railway

Route
- Termini: Howrah (HWH); Digha (DGHA)
- Stops: 7
- Distance travelled: 185 km (115 mi)
- Average journey time: 3 hours 20 minutes
- Service frequency: Daily
- Train number: 22897 / 22898

On-board services
- Classes: General Unreserved, Chair Car, AC Chair Car
- Seating arrangements: Yes
- Sleeping arrangements: Yes
- Auto-rack arrangements: Overhead racks
- Catering facilities: Available
- Observation facilities: Large windows
- Baggage facilities: No
- Other facilities: Below the seats

Technical
- Rolling stock: LHB coach
- Track gauge: 1,676 mm (5 ft 6 in)
- Operating speed: 56 km/h (35 mph) average including halts.

The 22897 / 22898 Kandari Express is an superfast express train belonging to Indian Railways South Eastern Railway zone that runs between Howrah Junction and Digha in India.

It operates as train number 22897 from Howrah Junction to Digha and as train number 22898 in the reverse direction, serving the states of West Bengal.

== Coaches ==
The 22897 / 98 Kandari Express has 1 AC chair car, 6 Chair car, seven general unreserved & two SLR (seating with luggage rake) coaches. It carries a pantry car.

As is customary with most train services in India, coach composition may be amended at the discretion of Indian Railways depending on demand.

== Service ==
The 22897 Howrah Junction–Digha Kandari Express covers the distance of 185 km (115 mi) in 3 hours 20 mins (55 km/h) and in 3 hours 20 mins as the 22898 Digha–Howrah Junction Kandari Express (55 km/h).

As the average speed of the train is equal to 55 km/h (34 mph), as per railway rules, its fare includes a Superfast surcharge.

== Routing ==
The 22897 / 98 Kandari Express runs from Howrah Junction via Santragachi Junction, Tamluk junction, Contai, Ramnagar to Digha.

== Traction ==
As the route is electrified, a Santragachi Loco Shed-based WAP-4 / WAP-7 electric locomotive pulls the train to its destination.
