= Howrah railway station =

Railway station in Howrah, West Bengal, India

Howrah
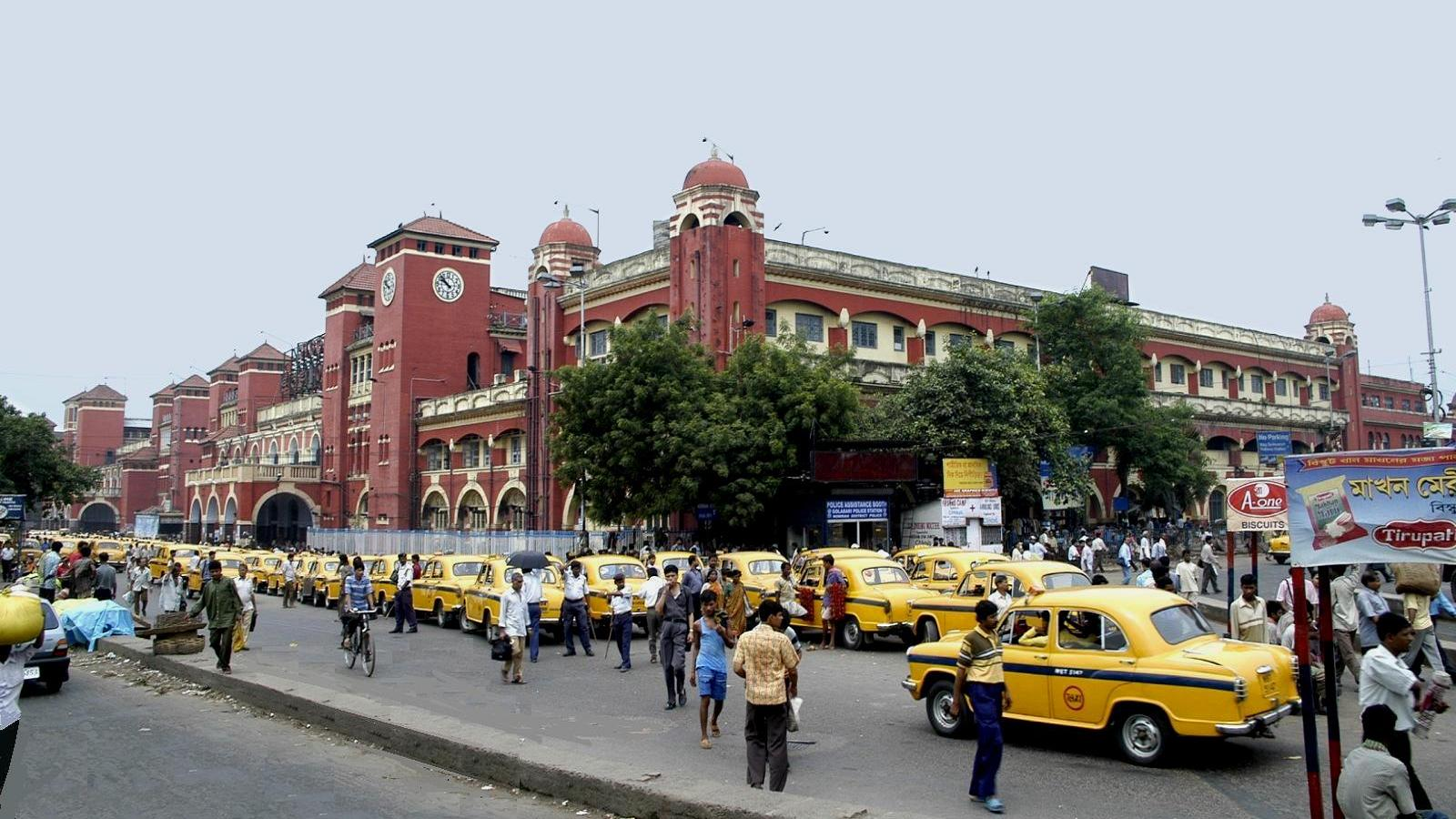
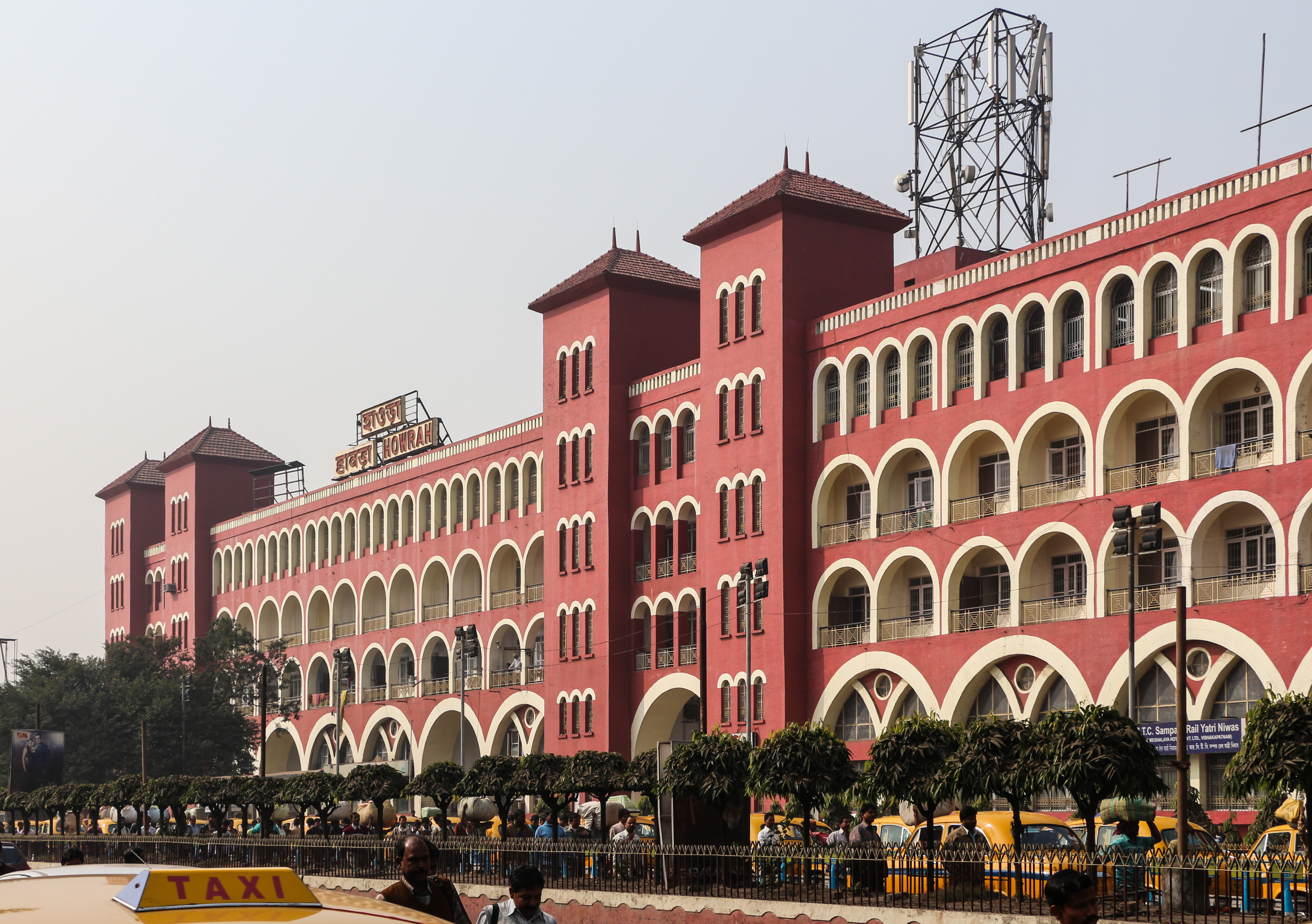
- Howrah Station Eastern (top) and South Eastern (bottom) Railway Complex, West Bengal

General information
- Location: Lower Foreshore Rd, Howrah, West Bengal 711101; India
- Coordinates: 22.5829°N 88.3428°E
- Elevation: 12 m (39 ft)
- System: Indian Railways; Kolkata Suburban Railway
- Owner: Indian Railways
- Operator: Eastern Railway; South Eastern Railway
- Lines: Howrah–Delhi main line; Howrah–Nagpur–Mumbai line; Howrah–Chennai main line; Howrah–Prayagraj–Mumbai line; Howrah–New Jalpaiguri line; Howrah–Gaya–Delhi line; Grand Chord
- Platforms: 24: Old Complex: 1–16; New Complex: 17–24
- Tracks: 25
- Connections: Howrah; Howrah Bus Depot; Howrah Ferry Ghat

Construction
- Structure type: At grade
- Parking: Parking
- Cycle facilities: Bicycle facilities
- Accessible: Yes

Other information
- Status: Active
- Station code: HWH
- Zone(s): Eastern Railway; South Eastern Railway
- Division(s): Howrah; Kharagpur

History
- Opened: August 15, 1854; 172 years ago
- Rebuilt: December 1, 1905; 120 years ago
- Electrified: December 14, 1957 (3 kV DC); 1968 (converted to 25 kV AC)
- Former names: East Indian Railway Company

Passengers
- 2026: 1.8 million/day (▲ high)
Services
Preceding station	Kolkata Suburban Railway	Following station
Terminus	Eastern Line Main line & Chord line	Liluah towards Bandel Junction
Tikiapara towards Midnapore	South Eastern Line Main line	Terminus
Route map
Location
- Location within Kolkata Location within West Bengal Location within India

Howrah railway station is a major railway terminus and connected Kolkata Metro station, serving the Kolkata metropolitan area. It is the largest, busiest and oldest surviving railway complex in India and the Kolkata metropolitan area, as well as one of the busiest and largest train stations in the world.

Seven long-distance rail lines terminate at Howrah, including the New Delhi–Howrah main line; the country's busiest. As of 2023, about 650 passenger trains pass through the station, serving more than 1 million passengers a day. Using its 23 operational platforms, the station handles a total of 252 Mail/Express trains and 500 suburban EMU trains daily; ten of the platforms are long enough to cater to trains with more than 24 coaches. Goods and parcel trains also originate and terminate at Howrah.

The first public train from Howrah was on 15 August 1854, on what is now the Howrah–Hooghly main line.

== History ==
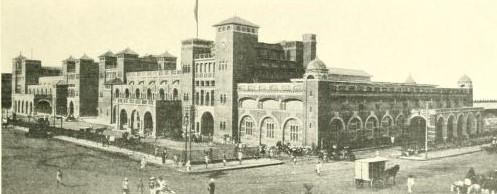
Old view of Howrah railway station

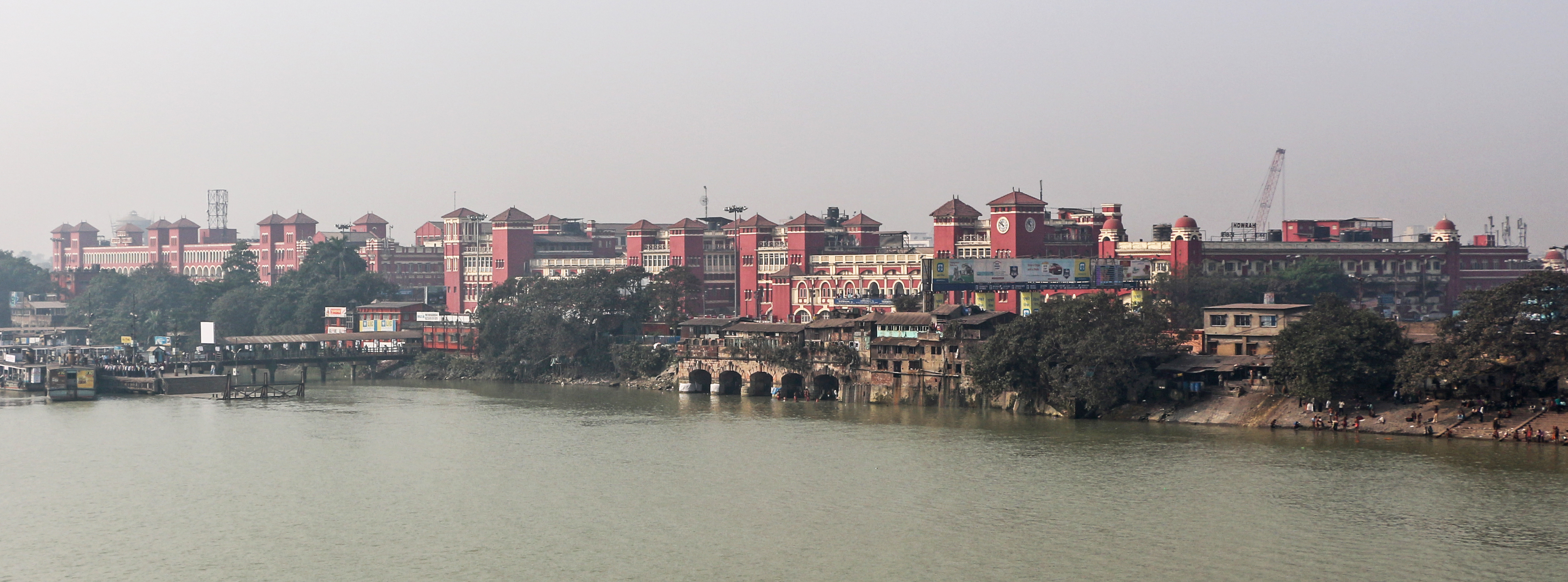
Present view of Howrah railway station

In 1849, a contract was signed between the East Indian Railway Company and East India Company and an initial amount allocated for the first section between Howrah and Raneegunge (Raniganj) via Pandooah (Pandua, Hooghly) and Burdwan (Bardhaman). Frederick Walter Simms, the consulting engineer to Government of India, initially envisaged a station on the right side of Hooghly in 1846. However, after the funds were sanctioned, Howrah was chosen as the terminus for the new line. A bridge spanning 1,700 feet (520 m) across the Hooghly River was considered unfeasible at the time. In the following years, discussions frequently arose about connecting the rail line to Calcutta.

On 17 June 1851, George Turnbull, the Chief Engineer of the East Indian Railway Company and his team of engineers submitted plans for a railway station at Howrah. Unaware of the future significance of railways in India, the government decided against purchasing the land and expensive waterfront required for the project in January 1852. Turnbull then developed alternative development plans that estimated the cost at 250,000 rupees. In October 1852, four tenders for the building of the station were received: they varied from 190,000 to 274,526 rupees. The size of the construction project – of whether Howrah should be a large station or Howrah be a smaller station in favour of a larger station being developed at another time – was debated from time to time during this process. Eventually land was bought.

The first experimental locomotive left Howrah on 18 June 1853 for the 37.5 miles to Pandoah. There was a gap between laying the line and opening it up since the ship carrying the carriages sank while the locomotive ended up in Australia. Eventually the carriages were built locally and the locomotive was directed to Calcutta. The first public departure from Howrah for the 23.5 miles to Hooghly was on 15 August 1854. During this period, the station was located at what is now the office of the divisional railway manager of Howrah. It consisted of one line and platform, a ticket window and a supporting building. Two weeks later the line to Pundoah was opened. In the first 4 months, over 109,000 passengers used the service. The locomotive was of the same type as the Fairy Queen.

Indians on their way to European colonies in the early 1800s came through the Howrah Station.

The increase of residents in the region around Howrah and Kolkata and the booming economy lead to an increasing demand for rail travel. Also, the rail network kept on growing continuously, e.g. was the bridge over the Rupnarayan River at Kolaghat completed on 19 April 1900 and connected Howrah with Kharagpur. The Bengal-Nagpur Railway was extended to Howrah in 1900, thus making Howrah an important railway centre. So in 1901, a new station building was proposed. The British architect Halsey Ricardo designed the new station. It was opened to the public on 1 December 1905, and completed by 1911.

In the 1980s, the station was expanded to 15 platforms. At the same time, a new Yatri Niwas (transit passenger facility) was built south of the original station frontage.

The new terminal complex was finished in 1992, creating a total of 19 platforms. This was extended by a further four platforms in 2009.

On 3 March 1969, the inaugural Rajdhani Express departed Howrah for New Delhi. In October 2011, India's first double-decker train, Howrah–Dhanbad Double Decker Express, left Howrah for Dhanbad. The first service of the Antyodaya Express, the Howrah–Ernakulam Antyodaya Express, was inaugurated in February 2017.

As per Indian Green Building Council, it was awarded CII-IGBC Silver Rating becoming the first green railway station among metropolitan cities in India.

The book Vibrant Edifice: The Saga of Howrah Station by Eastern Railways was released in 2005. This was written to celebrate the centenary of the building.

=== Tram terminus, Howrah ===
Until 1992, there was a tram terminus at Howrah Station. Trams departed for Sealdah Station, Rajabazar, Shyambazar, High Court, Dalhousie Square, Park Circus, Ballygunge, Tollygunge etc. Trams also departed for Bandhaghat and Shibpur.

The tram terminus was partially closed in 1971 while the Bandhaghat and Shibpur lines were closed. Many unauthorized vehicles and pedestrians began to traverse the tram tracks and so the routes were not continued. The terminus station was converted to underpasses and a bus terminus. The part of the tram terminus for other routes continued to function until 1992, when the Rabindra Setu (Howrah Bridge) was declared unfit to carry trams because it was a cantilever bridge.

=== Heritage museum ===
The nearby Rail Museum, Howrah was opened in 2006, and contains a section dedicated to the heritage and history of Howrah railway station. The railway museum, located south of the station, displays artefacts of historical importance related to the development of Eastern Railway. From 1909 to 1943 the Fairy Queen, the world's oldest operational steam locomotive, was displayed on a plinth inside the station.

== Rail services ==
The Eastern Railway runs local trains to Belur Math, Tarakeswar, Arambagh, Goghat, Katwa, Bandel, Sheoraphuli, Bardhaman, Serampore and numerous intermediate stations (see Howrah–Bardhaman main line, Howrah–Bardhaman chord and Tarakeswar branch line). There are also mail and express trains to Central, North and North-East India. A narrow-gauge line formerly used to connect Bardhaman and Katwa, served by DMU trains; but now this line is also converted to broad gauge and used by EMU trains like all the other lines.

The South Eastern Railway, operates local trains to Amta, Mecheda, Panskura, Haldia, Tamluk, Medinipur and Kharagpur and mail and express trains to Central, West and South India. South Eastern Railway, connects with the Great Indian Peninsular Railway (GIPR) route to Mumbai and Chennai.

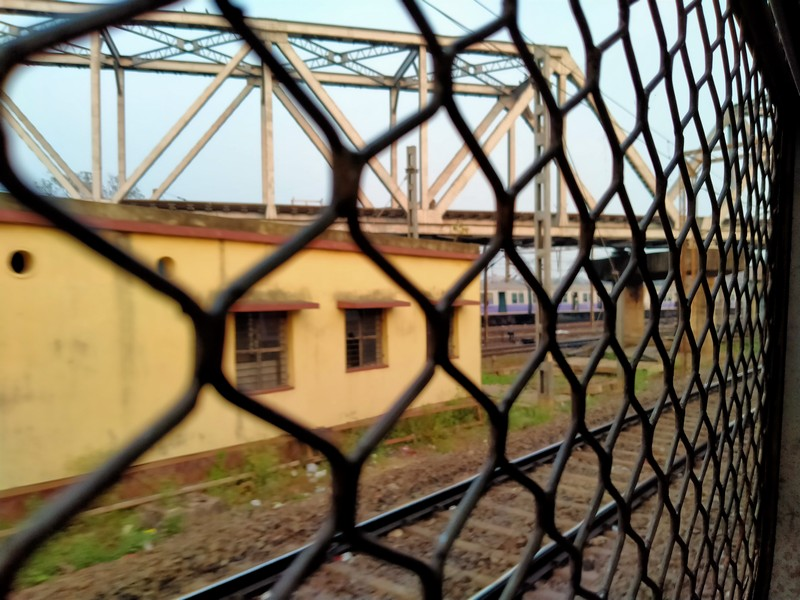
Goods train line is crossing south eastern line near Tikiapara EMU carshed

The Eastern Railway and South Eastern Railway sections are connected by two links. One is the Lilua–Tikiapara link (used only by goods train) and the other is the Rajchandrapur/Dankuni–Santragachhi/Andul link, which is used by goods trains and some express trains avoiding Howrah.

Four major rail routes end at Howrah. They are the Howrah–Delhi, Howrah–Mumbai, Howrah–Chennai and Howrah–Guwahati routes.

== Major trains ==
Major trains that originating from Howrah Junction:

Train	Numbers
Howrah–Jabalpur Shaktipunj Express	11447/11448
Howrah–Ranchi Shatabdi Express	12019/12020
Howrah–Barbil Jan Shatabdi Express	12021/12022
Howrah–Patna Jan Shatabdi Express	12023/12024
Howrah–New Jalpaiguri Shatabdi Express	12041/12042
Howrah–Bhubaneswar Jan Shatabdi Express	12073/12074
Howrah–Pune Azad Hind Express	12129/12130
Howrah–Gwalior Chambal Express	12175/12176
Howrah–Mathura Chambal Express	12177/12178
Howrah–Pune Duronto Express	12221/12222
Howrah–SMVT Bengaluru Duronto Express	12245/12246
Howrah–Anand Vihar Yuva Express	12249/12250
Howrah–Mumbai CSMT Duronto Express	12261/12262
Howrah–New Delhi Duronto Express	12273/12274
Howrah–Puri Shatabdi Express	12277/12278
Howrah–New Delhi Rajdhani Express (via Gaya)	12301/12302
Howrah–New Delhi Poorva Express (via Patna)	12303/12304
Howrah–New Delhi Rajdhani Express (via Patna)	12305/12306
Howrah–Jodhpur Express	12307/12308
Howrah–Kalka Netaji Express / Kalka Mail	12311/12312
Howrah–Mumbai CSMT Mail (via Gaya)	12321/12322
Howrah–Barmer Express	12323/12324
Howrah–Jammu Tawi Himgiri Superfast Express	12331/12332
Howrah–Prayagraj Vibhuti Express	12333/12334
Howrah–Bolpur Shantiniketan Express	12337/12338
Howrah–Dhanbad Coalfield Express	12339/12340
Howrah–Asansol Agnibina Express	12341/12342
Howrah–Guwahati Saraighat Superfast Express	12345/12346
Howrah–Rampurhat Sahid Express	12347/12348
Howrah–Rajendra Nagar Express	12351/12352
Howrah–Lalkuan Express	12353/12354
Howrah–Jaisalmer Superfast Express	12371/12372
Howrah–New Delhi Poorva Express (via Gaya)	12381/12382
Howrah–Tiruchirapalli Superfast Express	12663/12664
Howrah–Kanyakumari Express	12665/12666
Howrah–Secunderabad Falaknuma Express	12703/12704
Howrah–Mumbai CSMT Mail (via Nagpur)	12809/12810
Howrah–Jamshedpur Steel Express	12813/12814
Howrah–Puri Dhauli Express	12821/12822
Howrah–Purulia Express	12827/12828
Howrah–Ahmedabad Superfast Express	12833/12834
Howrah–Puri Express	12837/12838
Howrah–MGR Chennai Central Mail	12839/12840
Howrah–MGR Chennai Central Coromandel Express	12841/12842
Howrah–Digha AC Superfast Express	12847/12848
Howrah–Digha Tamralipta Express	12857/12858
Howrah–Mumbai CSMT Gitanjali Express	12859/12560
Howrah–SMVT Bengaluru Superfast Express	12863/128864
Howrah–Puducherry Express	12867/12868
Howrah–Mumbai CSMT Weekly Express	12869/12870
Howrah–Titlagarh Ispat Express	12871/12872
Howrah–Purulia Rupashi Bangla Express	12883/12884
Howrah–Bhojudih Aranyak Express	12885/12886
Howrah–Gandhidham Garba Superfast Express	12937/12938
Howrah–Amritsar Mail	13006/13007
Howrah–Yog Nagari Rishikesh Doon Express	13009/13010
Howrah–Malda Town Intercity Express (via Rampurhat)	13011/13012
Howrah–Jamalpur Kavi Guru Express	13015/13016
Howrah–Azimganj Ganadevata Express	13017/13018
Howrah–Kathgodam Bagh Express	13019/13020
Howrah–Raxaul Mithila Express	13021/13022
Howrah–Gaya Express	13023/13024
Howrah–Bhopal Weekly Express	13025/13026
Howrah–Azimganj Kavi Guru Express	13027/13028
Howrah–Mokama Express	13029/13030
Howrah–Jaynagar Express	13031/13032
Howrah–Katihar Weekly Express	13033/13034
Howrah–Dehradun Upasana Express	13035/13036
Howrah–Dehradun Kumbh Express	13037/13038
Howrah–Raxaul Express	13043/13044
Howrah–Deoghar Mayurakshi Express	13045/13046
Howrah–Radhikapur Kulik Express	13053/13054
Howrah–Balurghat Bi-Weekly Express	13063/13064
Howrah–Anand Vihar Terminal Amrit Bharat Express	13065/13066
Howrah–Jamalpur Express	13071/13072
Howrah–Sahibganj Intercity Express	13427/13428
Howrah–Malda Town Intercity Express (via Azimganj)	13465/13466
Howrah–Darbhanga Express	15235/15236
Howrah–Muzaffarpur Jan Sadharan Express	15271/15272
Puri–Kamakhya Weekly Express (via Howrah)	15643/15644
New Jalpaiguri–Digha Paharia Express (via Howrah)	15721/15722
Howrah–Dibrugarh Kamrup Express (via Guwahati)	15959/15960
Howrah–Dibrugarh Kamrup Express (via Rangapara North)	15961/15962
Howrah–Jagdalpur Samaleshwari Express	18005/18006
Howrah–Vasco da Gama Amaravati Express	18047/18048
Howrah–Hatia Kriya Yoga Express	18615/18616
Howrah–Ranchi Intercity Express (via Adra)	18627/18628
Howrah–Rourkela Vande Bharat Express	20871/20872
Howrah–Tirupati Humsafar Express	20889/20890
Howrah–Ranchi Vande Bharat Express	20897/20898
Howrah–New Jalpaiguri Vande Bharat Express	22301/22302
Howrah–Gaya Vande Bharat Express	22303/22304
Howrah–Bikaner Superfast Express	22307/22308
Howrah–Jamalpur Vande Bharat Express	22309/22310
Howrah–New Jalpaiguri AC Superfast Express	22309/22310
Howrah–Siuri Hool Express	22321/22322
Howrah–Patna Vande Bharat Express	22347/22348
Howrah–Dhanbad Black Diamond Express	22387/22388
Howrah–Mysore Express	22817/22818
Howrah–Yesvantpur Superfast Express	22831/2283
Howrah–Kantabanji Ispat Express	22861/22862
Howrah–SMVT Bengaluru AC Superfast Express	22863/22864
Howrah–Ernakulam Antyodaya Express	22877/22878
Howrah–SMVT Bengaluru Humsafar Express	22887/22888
Howrah–Ranchi Intercity Express (via Tatanagar)	22891/22892
Howrah–Sainagar Shirdi Express	22894/22895
Howrah–Puri Vande Bharat Express	22895/22896
Howrah–Digha Kandari Express	22897/22898
Howrah–Indore Shipra Express	22911/22912
Howrah–Kamakhya Vande Bharat Sleeper Express	27575/27576
Howrah–Rampurhat Viswabharati Fast Passenger	53047/53048

== Station facilities ==
The station is the divisional headquarters for the Eastern Railway.

The station has 24 platforms.

- Platforms 1 to 15 are located in the old complex, referred to as "Terminal 1". It serves the local and long-distance trains of Eastern Railway and local trains of South Eastern Railway.
- Platforms 17 to 24 are in the new complex, referred to as "Terminal 2". It serves the long-distance trains of South Eastern Railway.
- Currently Platform No. 8 in "Terminal 1" is the longest in Howrah Station at 961 metres (3,153 ft), followed by Platform No. 21 in "Terminal 2" which is 930.25 metres (3,052.0 ft) long & Current Platform No. 1 "Terminal 1" in which is 916 metres (3,005 ft) long. Work is going on at Platform No. 1 far end to link the 380 metres (1,250 ft) long Goods Train Platform under Bankim Setu, which is slated to be completed by 2025. Once completed Platform No. 1 of Howrah Station "Terminal 1" will measure a staggering 1,296 metres (4,252 ft) in length & become the 3rd Longest railway Platform in India & in the World. Indian Railways are also constructing Platform No. 16 in "Terminal 1" and Platform No. 24 and 25 in "Terminal 2" as envisioned to expand this railway junction.

There is a large covered waiting area between the main complex and the platforms and other areas for passengers awaiting connecting trains. Free wifi is present at the station. In addition, there is a transit passenger facility with dormitory, single-room and double-room accommodation. First-class passengers wait in an air-conditioned area with balcony views of the Kolkata Skyline and the Howrah Bridge.

The station platforms have carriageways for motor vehicles within the complex including two carriageways to platforms 8 and 9 for Eastern Railway and to platforms 21 and 22 for South Eastern Railway. Flyovers at the ends of the platforms allow motor vehicles to exit the complex quickly.

Sampath Rail Yatri Niwas and Regional Rail Museum are a part of "Terminal 2" Howrah station complex.

=== Services for rolling stock ===
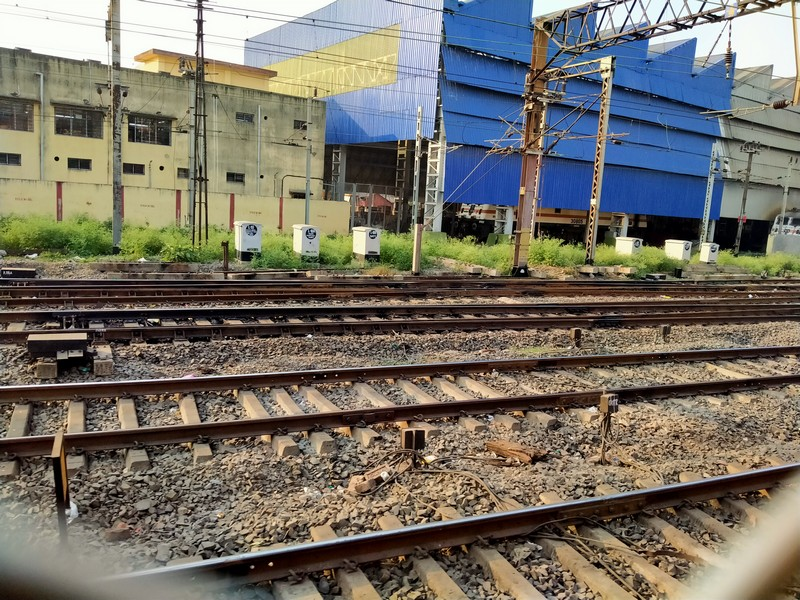
Electric loco shed at Howrah

The electric-locomotive shed has room for 96 locomotives. There is also an electric-trip shed with the capacity to hold up to 20 locomotives. The sheds accommodate 175+ WAP-4, WAP-5, and WAP-7 locomotives. The EMU car shed has over 15 parking slots. The station has a coach maintenance complex.

==== Diesel Loco Shed ====
The station has a diesel-locomotive shed with room for 84 locomotives.

Serial No.	Locomotive Class	Horsepower	Holding
1.	WDM-3A	3100	15
2.	WDM-3D	3300	16
3.	WDP-4/4D	4000/4500	18
4.	WAP-4	5050	38
Total Locomotives Active as of February 2026			87

=== Connectivity ===
==== Metro station ====
Howrah station has an underground station, which in turn, is a part of Green Line of the Kolkata Metro serves the area. It is the deepest station of the Kolkata Metro and also the deepest in the country. To the east, the station connects to Mahakaran station in Kolkata through India's first under-river metro tunnel beneath the Hooghly river; whilst to the west the adjacent station is Howrah Maidan. The station was opened to the public on 15th March 2024.

== Gallery ==
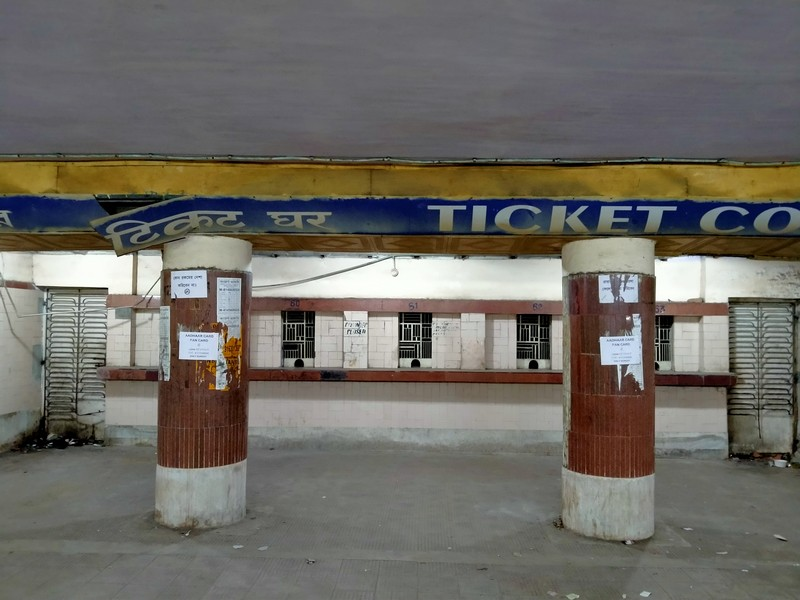
Abandoned ticket counter inside the ferry subway

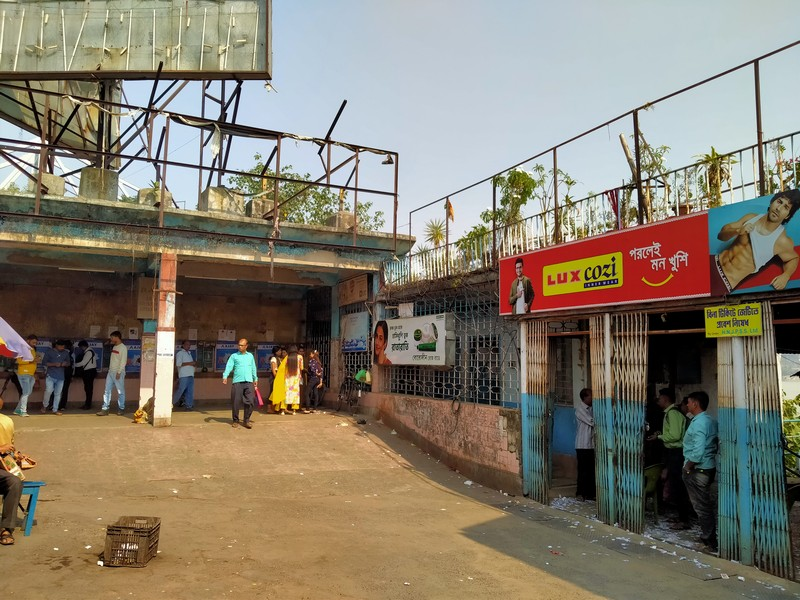
Smooth interchange between train, taxi and ferry service

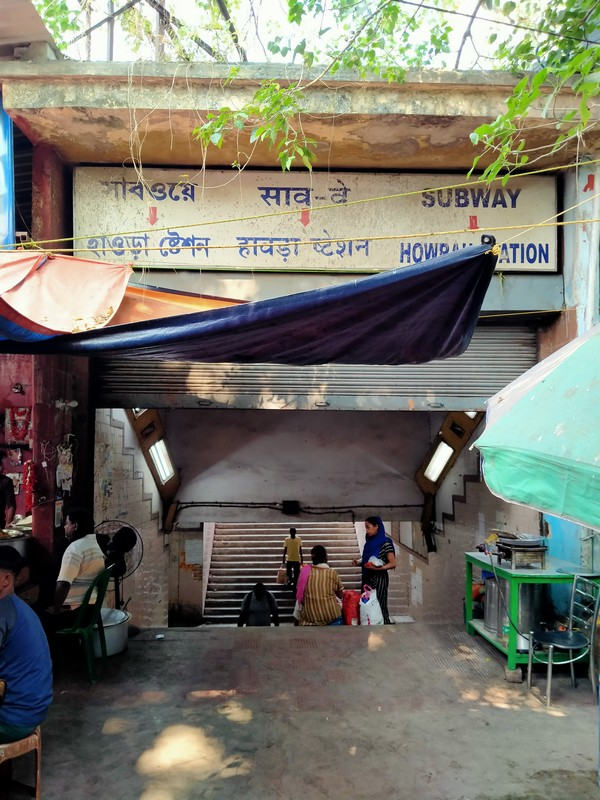
Ferry terminus side entrance of subway

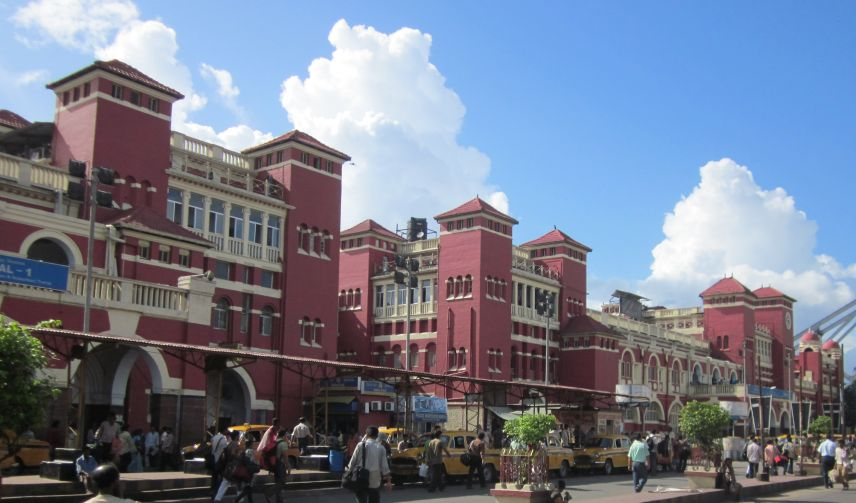
Howrah station

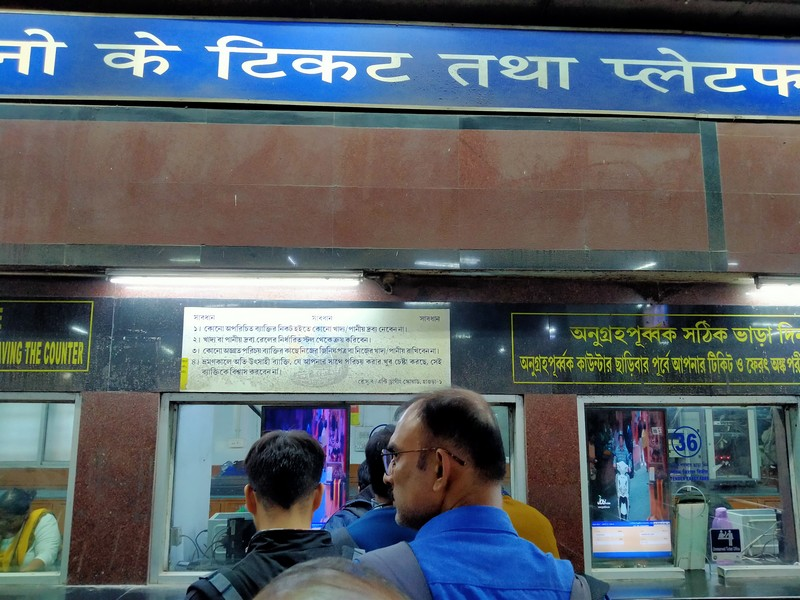
General ticket counter at old building

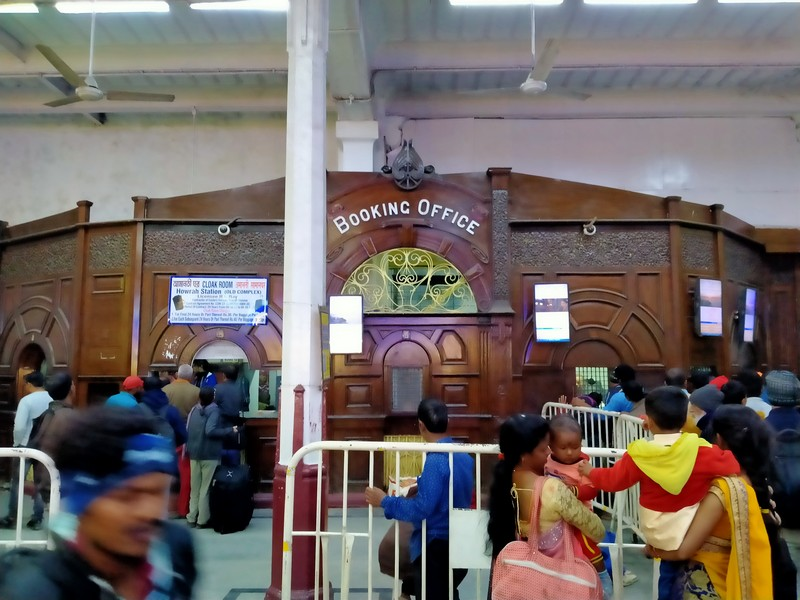
British Era wooden ticket counter is still active in old building

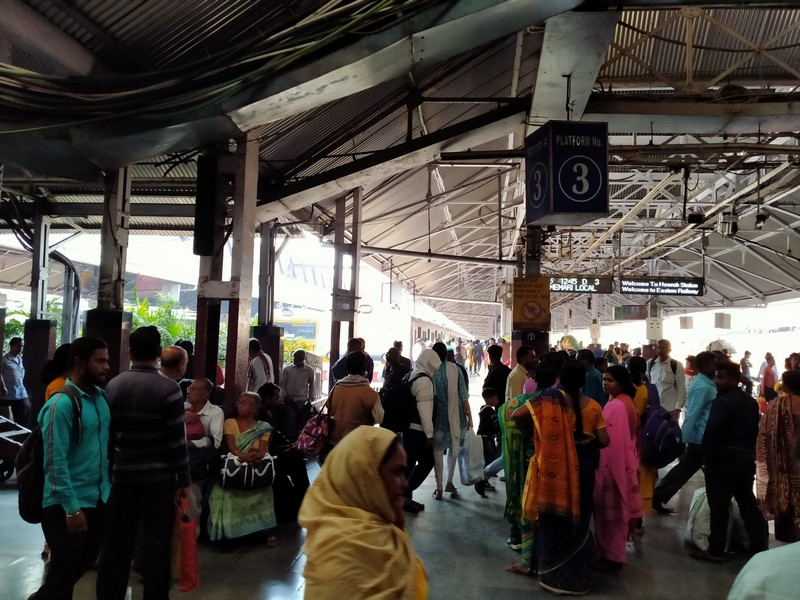
Platform of Howrah Station

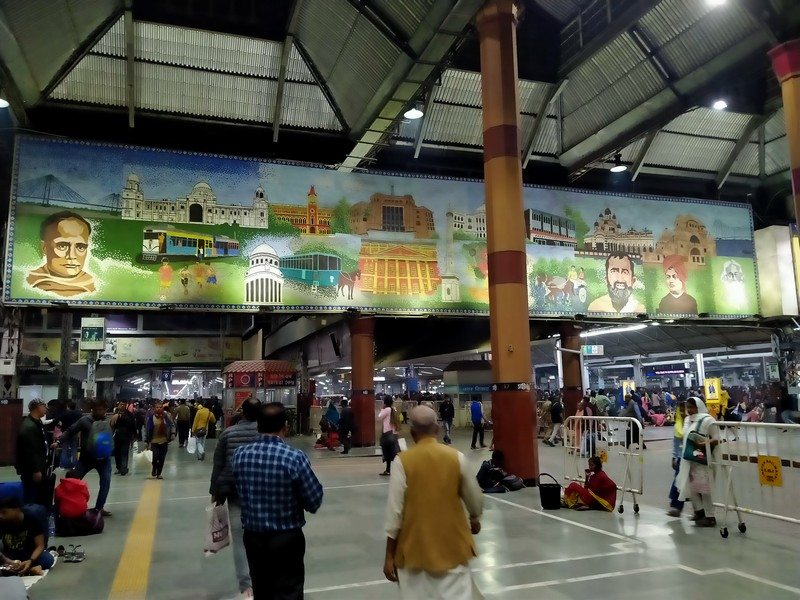
Different icons of Kolkata & Howrah is being displayed by mosaic at waiting place

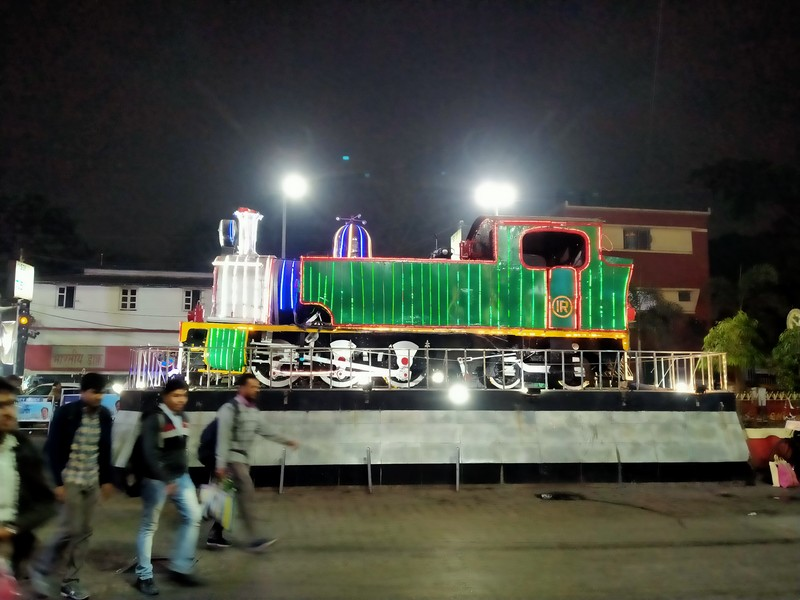
An abandoned narrow gauge steam loco is being displayed in front of old building

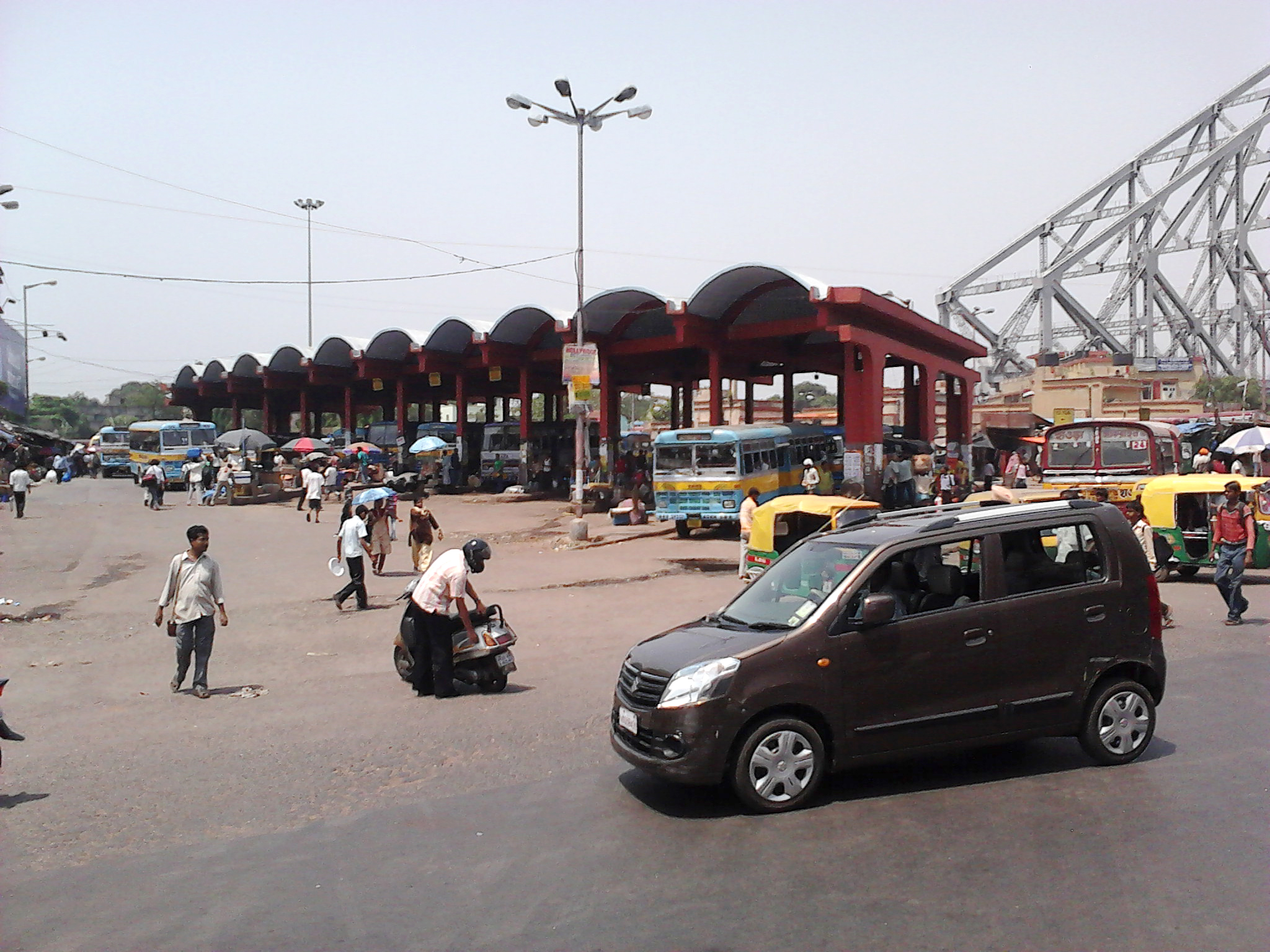
Howrah station bus terminal

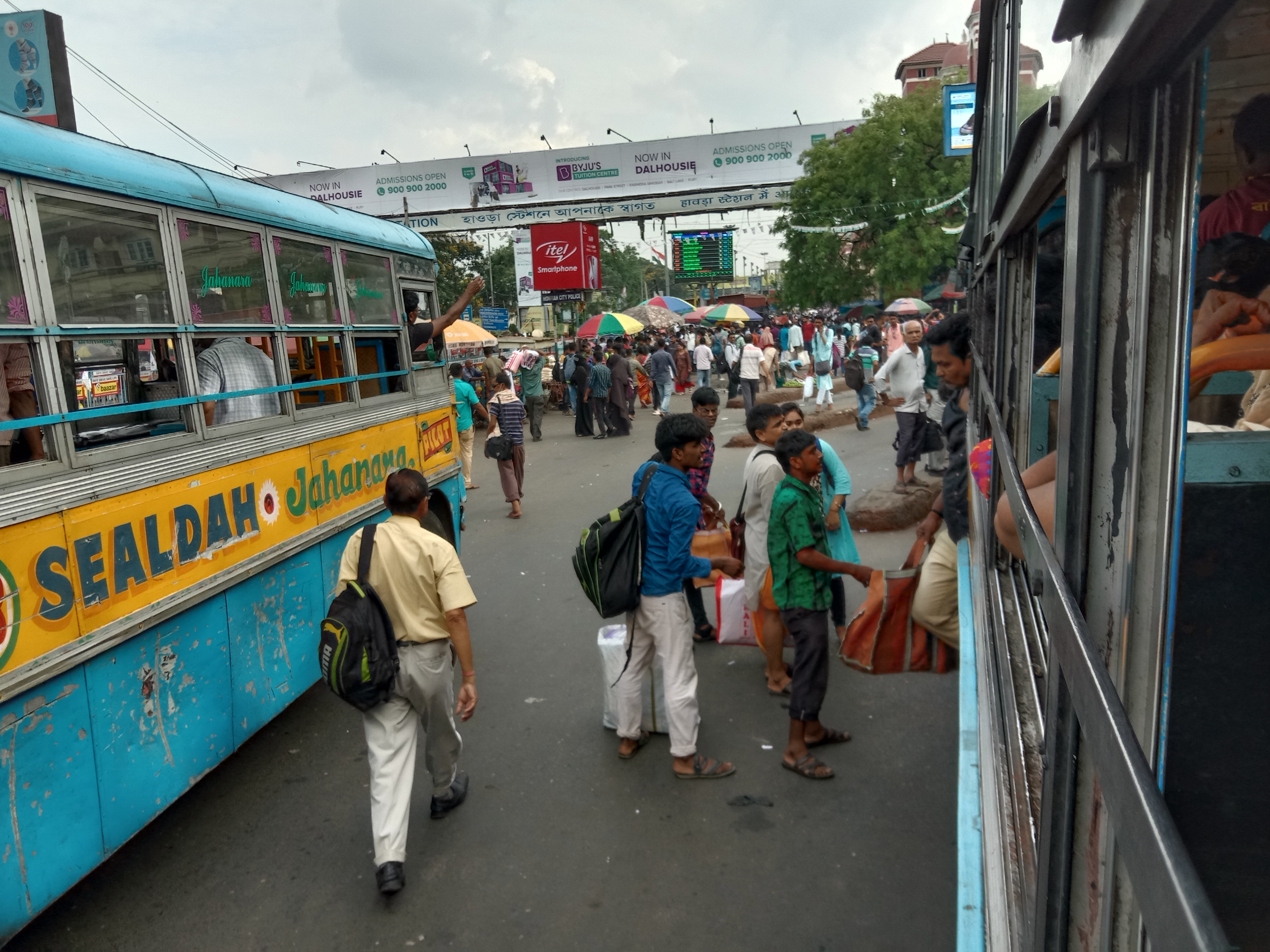
Public buses near Howrah railway station entrance

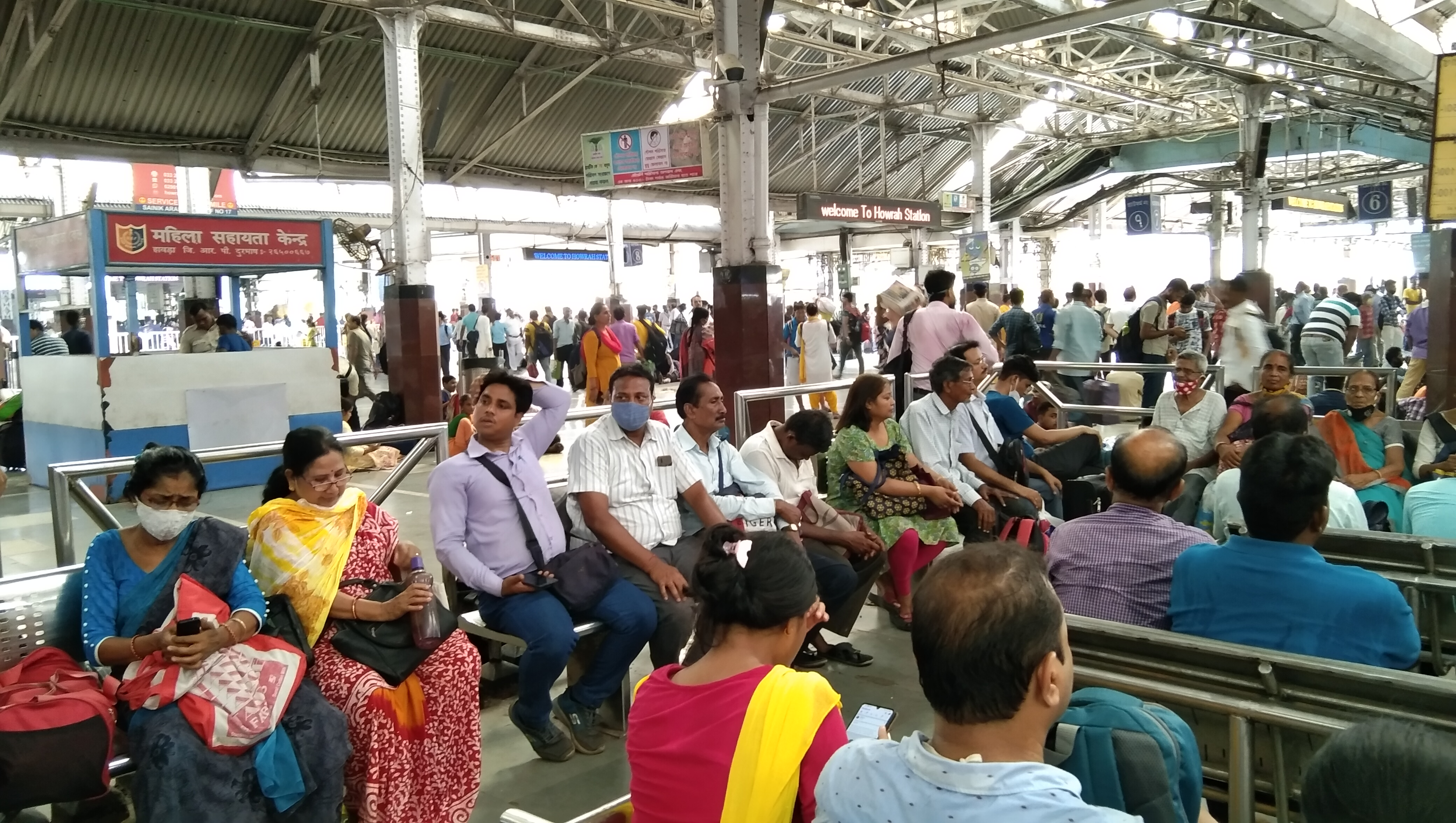
Waiting Travelers at Howrah Railway Station

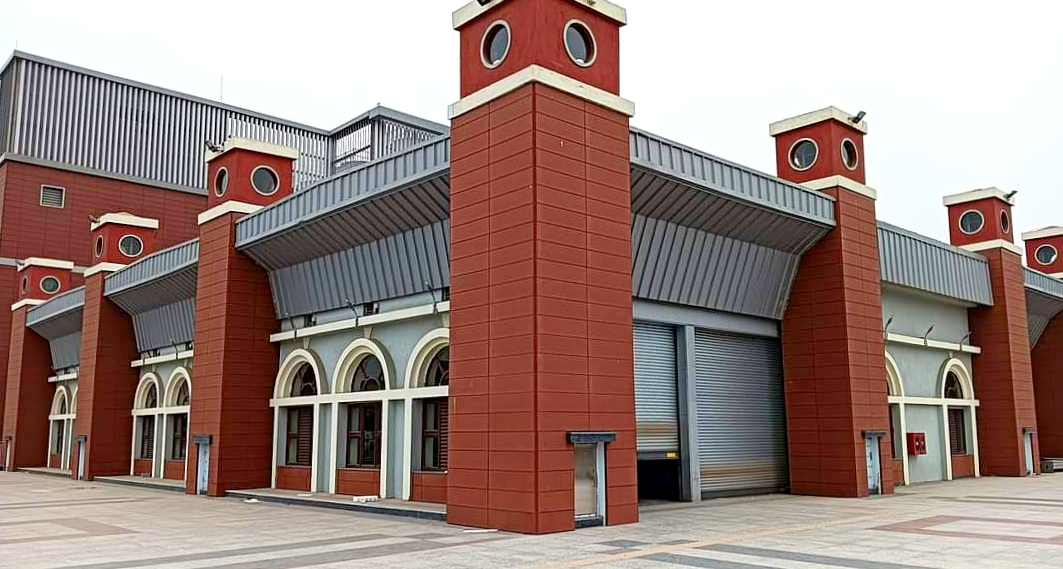
Howrah metro station

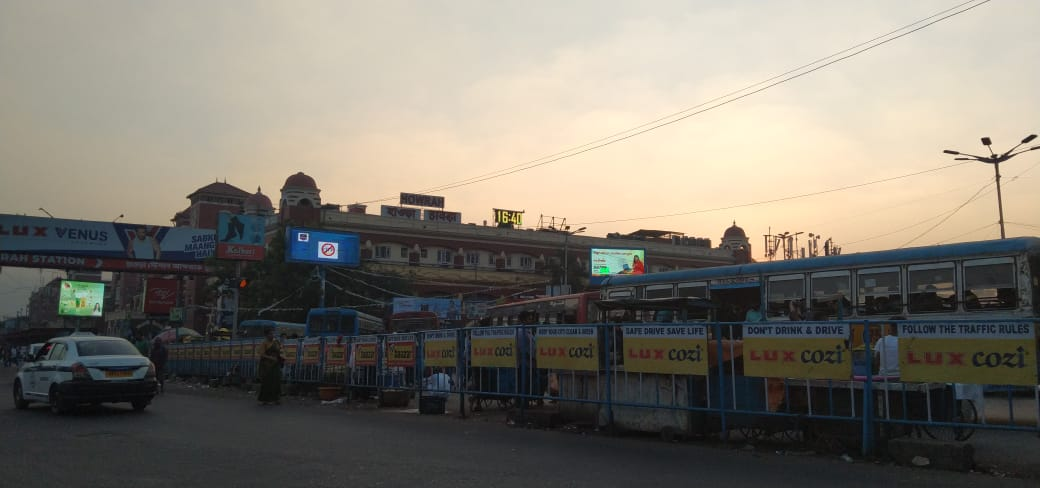
Evening View

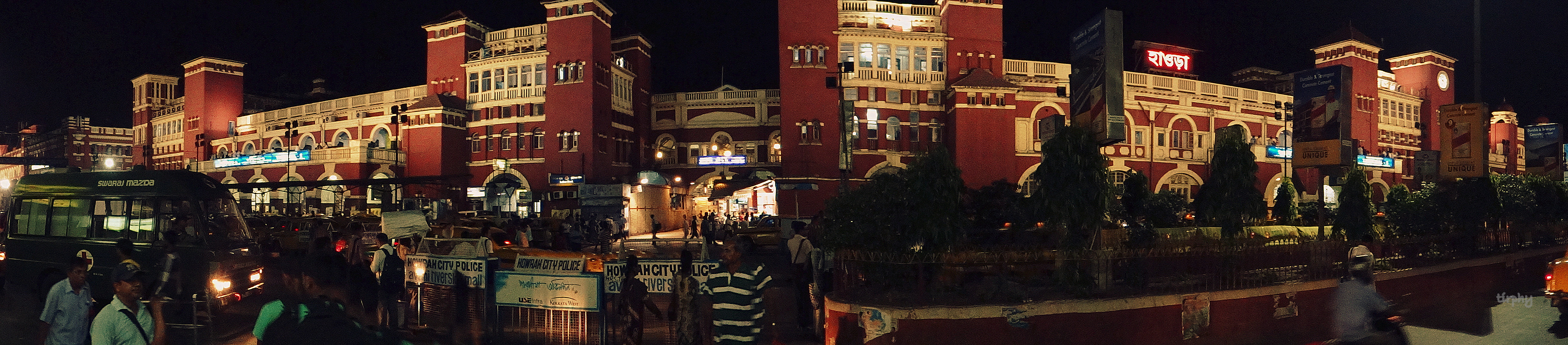
Howrah station night view

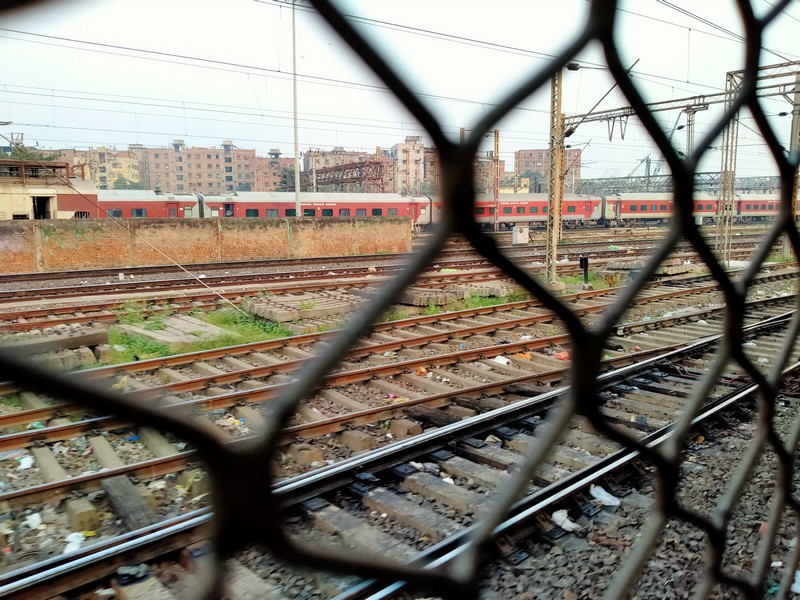
Eastern & South Eastern lines are splitting

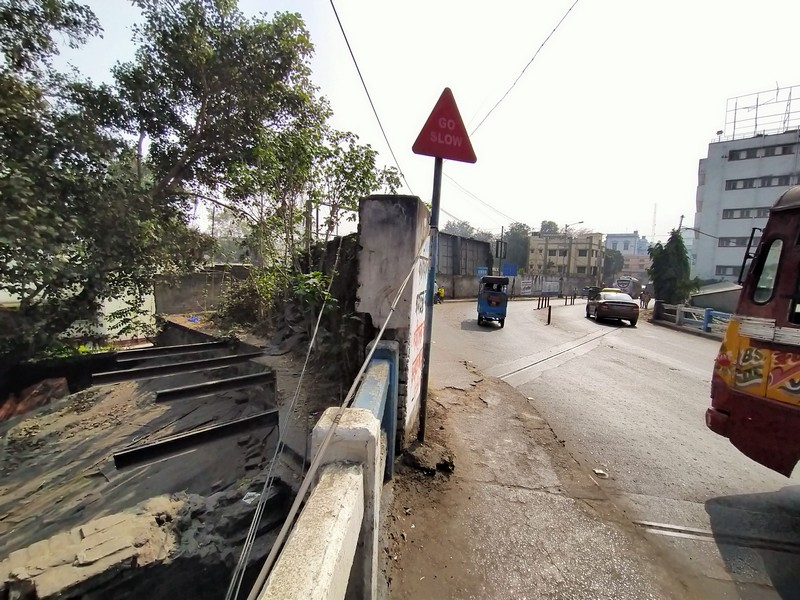
Remains of Shibpur bound tram tracks under remains of Buckland bridge

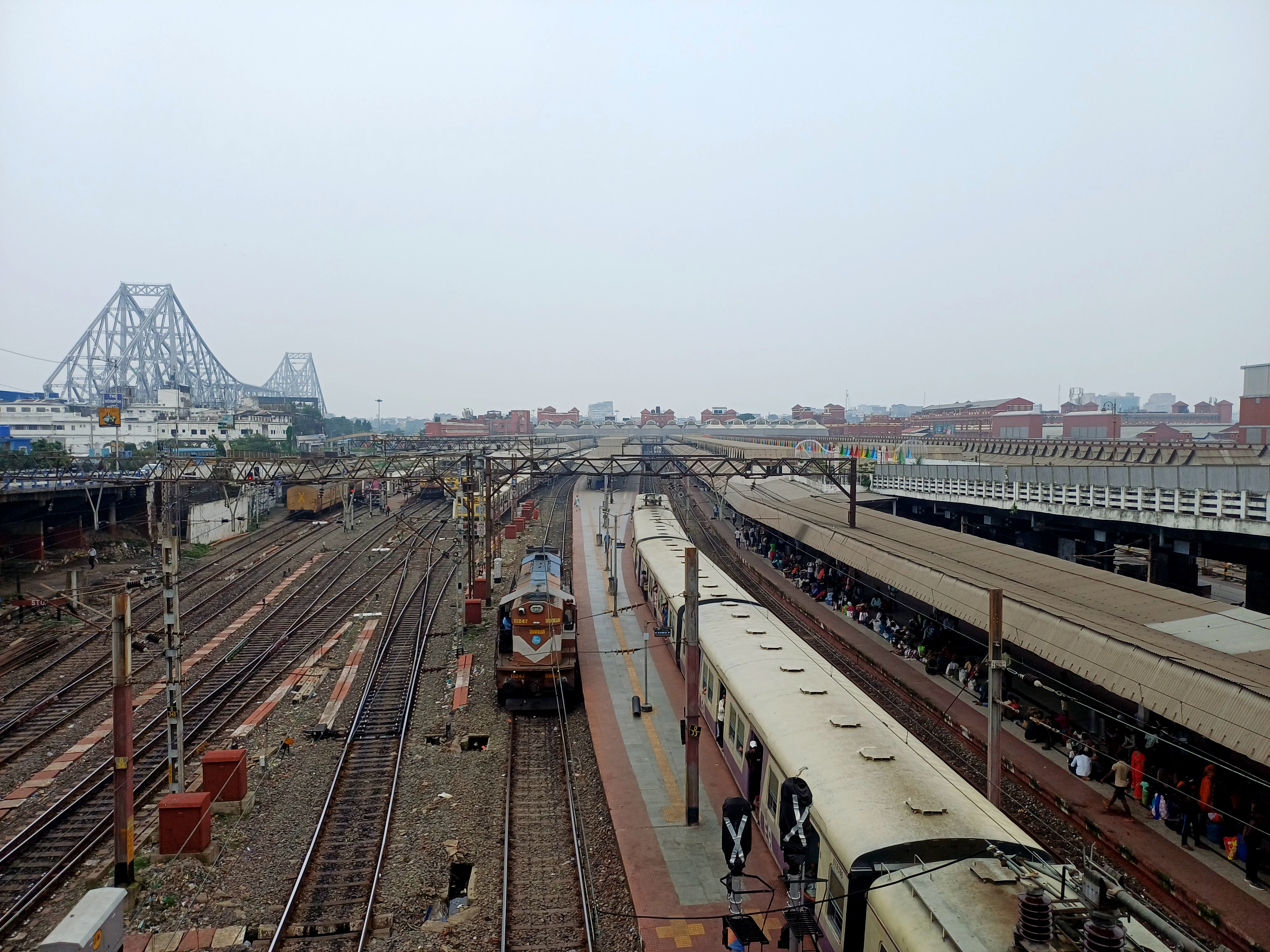
A view of Howrah railway station in Kolkata, West Bengal, India, showing the railway platforms, tracks and passenger areas. The Howrah Bridge (Rabindra Setu) is visible in the background on the left.
