= Howrah–Mysore Express =

Train in India

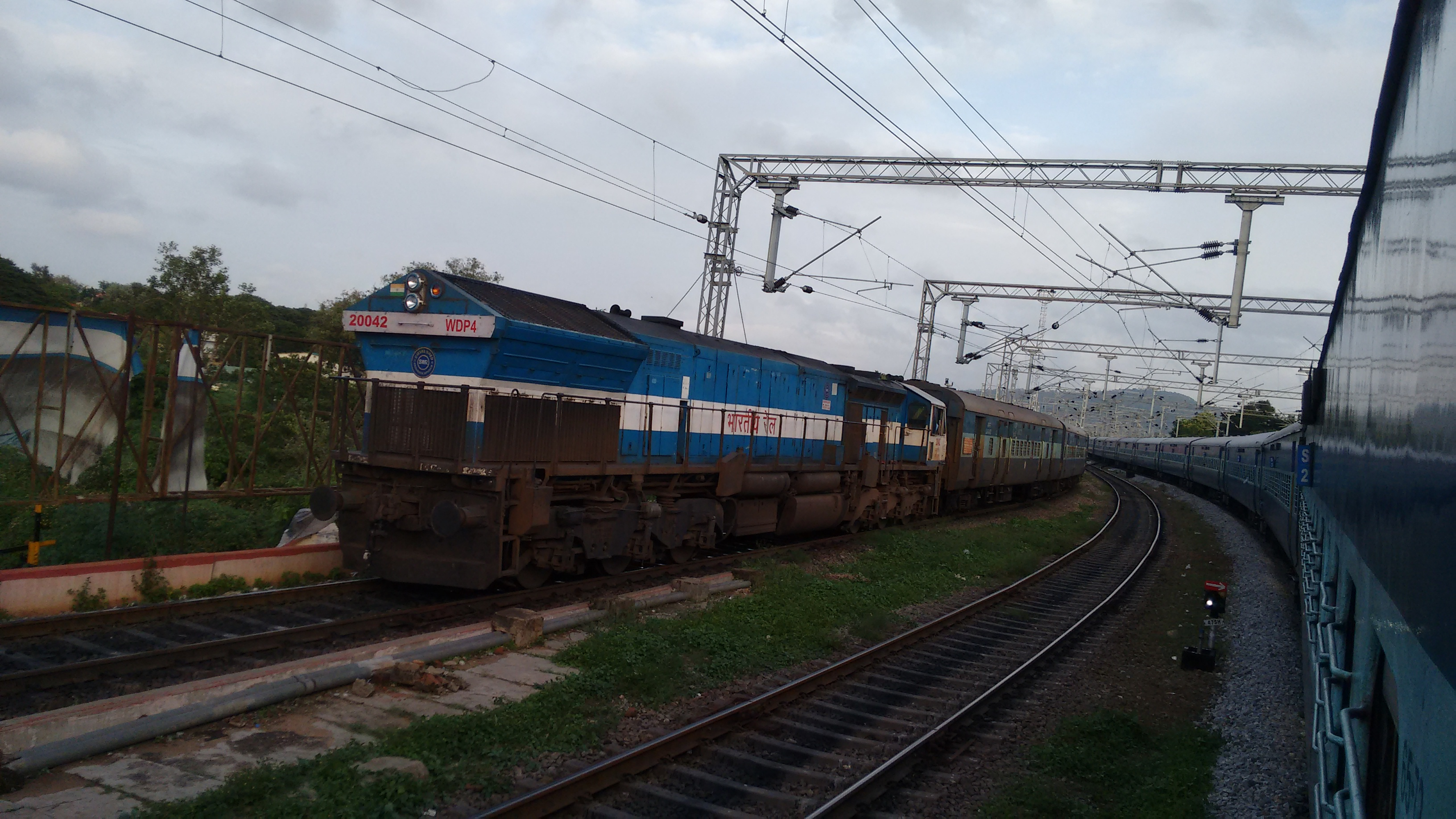
- Howrah–Mysore Express at Mysore railway station yard

Overview
- Service type: Superfast
- First service: 19 February 2012; 14 years ago
- Current operator: South Eastern Railway zone

Route
- Termini: Howrah Junction; Mysore Junction
- Stops: 19
- Distance travelled: 2,100 km (1,305 mi)
- Average journey time: 37 hours 07 mins
- Service frequency: Weekly
- Train number: 22817 / 22818

On-board services
- Classes: AC 2 tier, AC 3 tier, sleeper class, general unreserved
- Seating arrangements: Yes
- Sleeping arrangements: Yes
- Catering facilities: No

Technical
- Rolling stock: Standard Indian Railways coaches
- Track gauge: 1,676 mm (5 ft 6 in)
- Operating speed: 59 km/h (37 mph)
Route map
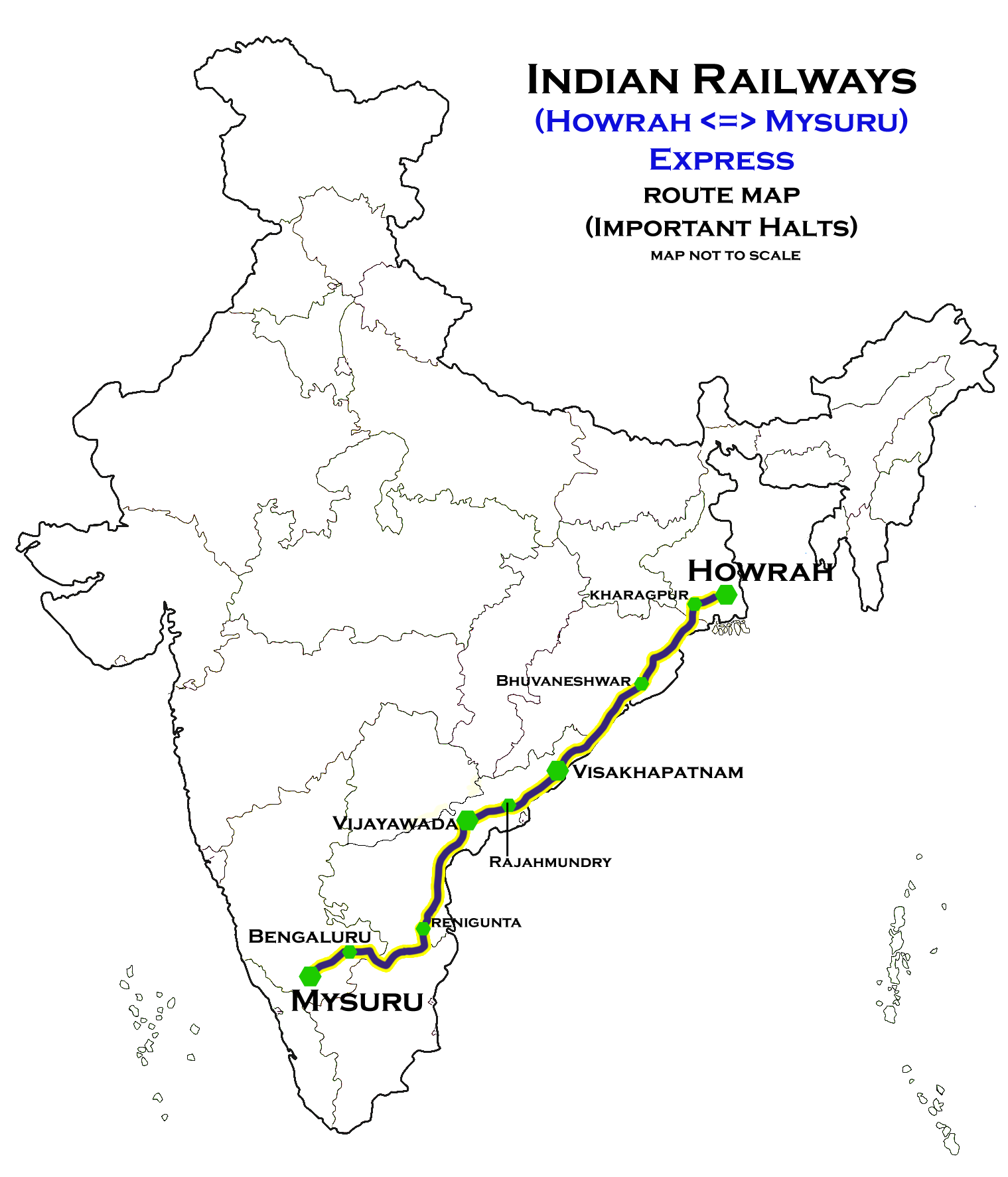

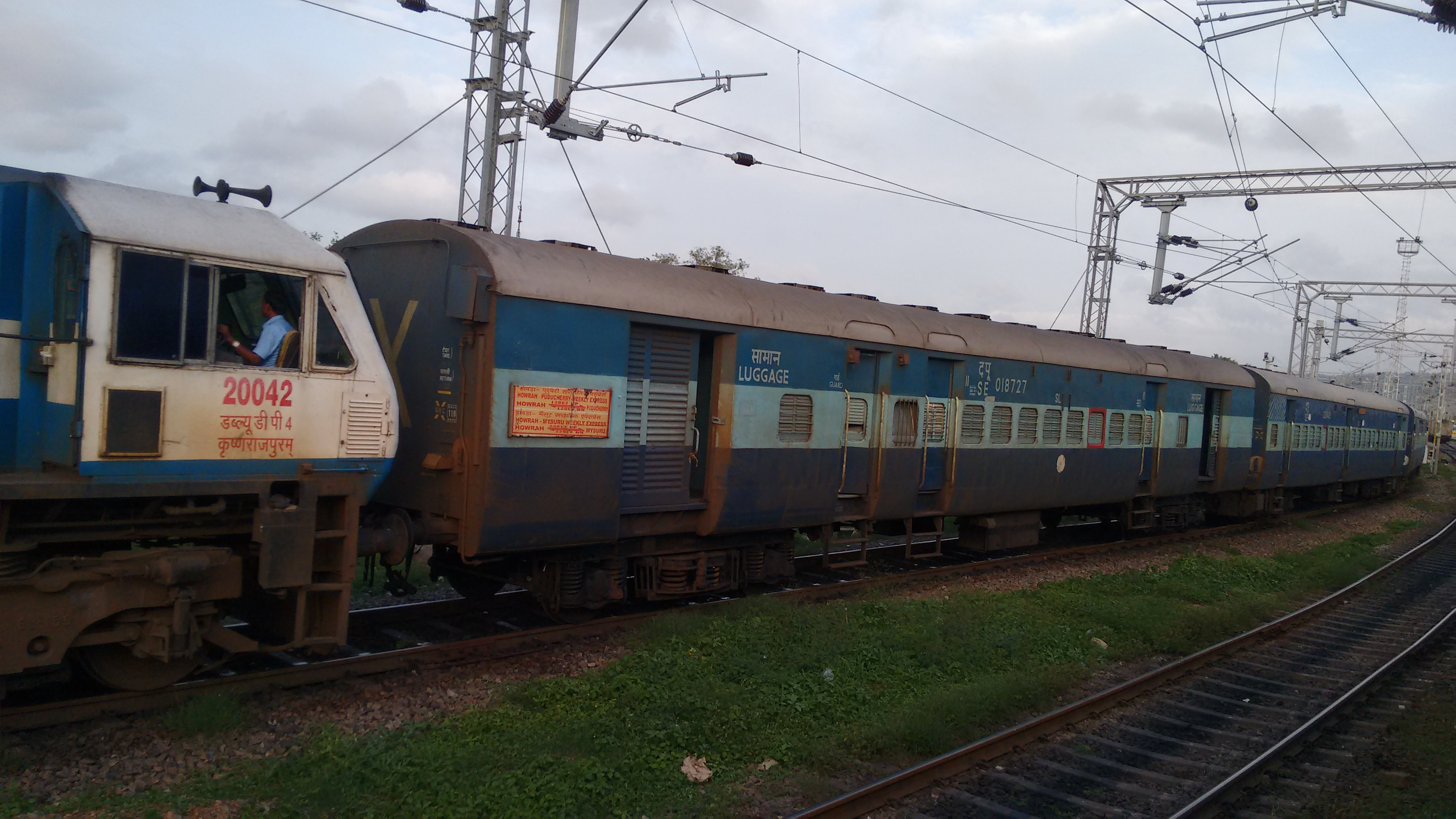

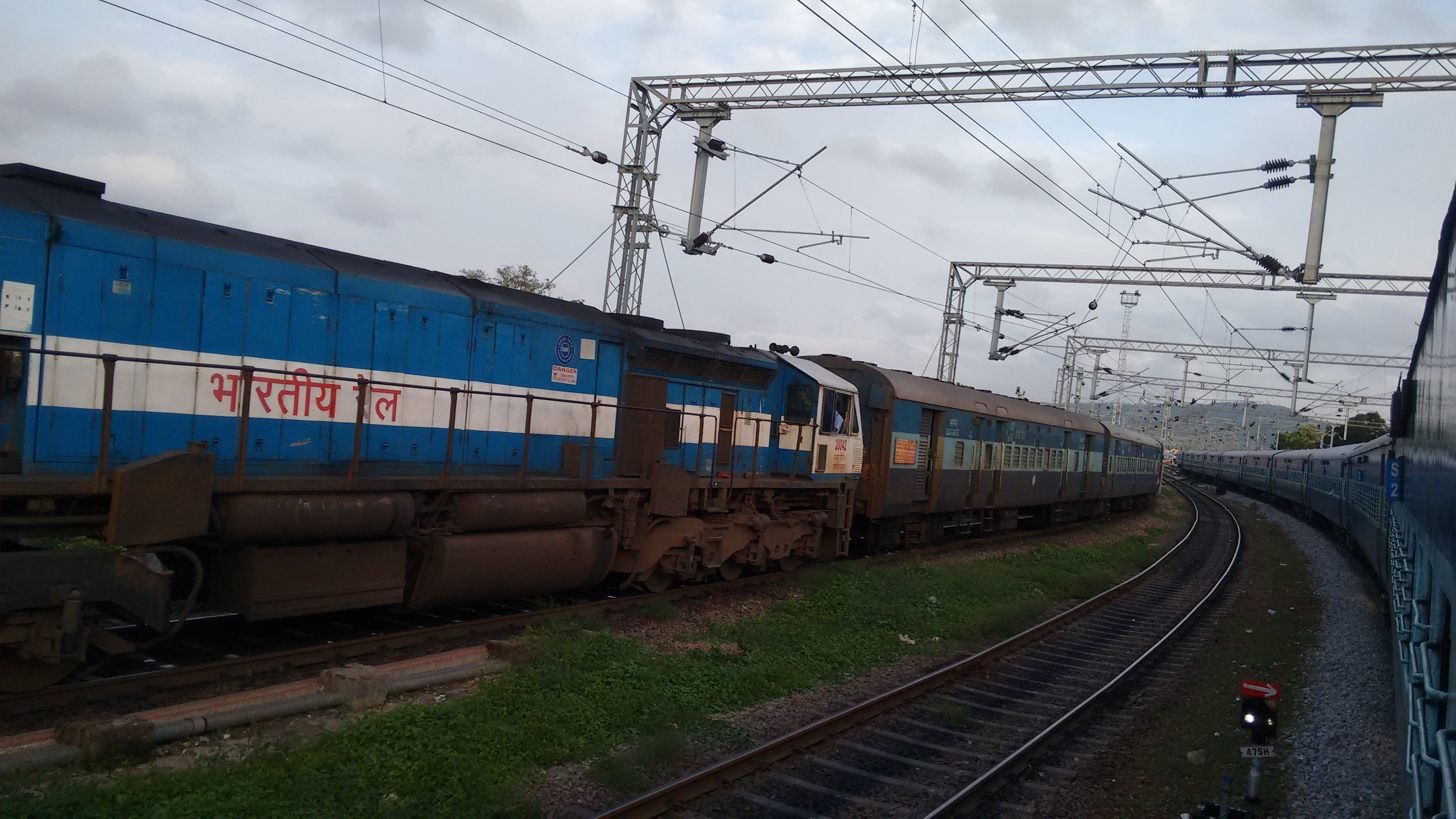

The 22817 / 18 Howrah–Mysuru Express is a Superfast Express train belonging to Indian Railways South Eastern Railway zone that runs between Howrah Junction and Mysore Junction in India.

It operates as train number 22817 from Howrah Junction to Mysore Junction and as train number 22818 in the reverse direction, serving the states of West Bengal, Odisha, Andhra Pradesh, Tamil Nadu & Karnataka.

== Coaches ==
The 22817 / 18 Howrah–Mysore Express has one AC 2-tier, six AC 3-tier, 11 sleeper class, two general unreserved and two SLR (seating with luggage rake) coaches. It does not carry a pantry car.

As is customary with most train services in India, coach composition may be amended at the discretion of Indian Railways depending on demand.

== Service ==
The 22817 Howrah Junction–Mysore Junction Express covers the distance of 2,100 km (1,305 mi) in 35 hours 35 mins (59 km/h) and in 38 hours 20 mins as the 22818 Mysore Junction–Howrah Junction Express (55 km/h).

As the average speed of the train is above 55 km/h (34 mph), as per railway rules, its fare includes a Superfast surcharge.

== Routing ==
The 22817 / 18 Howrah–Mysore Express runs from Howrah Junction via Kharagpur Junction, Khurda Road Junction, Visakhapatnam, Vijayawada Junction, Renigunta Junction, Jolarpettai Junction, Bangalore City to Mysore Junction.
