= Tiruchchirappalli–New Jalpaiguri Amrit Bharat Express =

Amrit Bharat Express train route in India

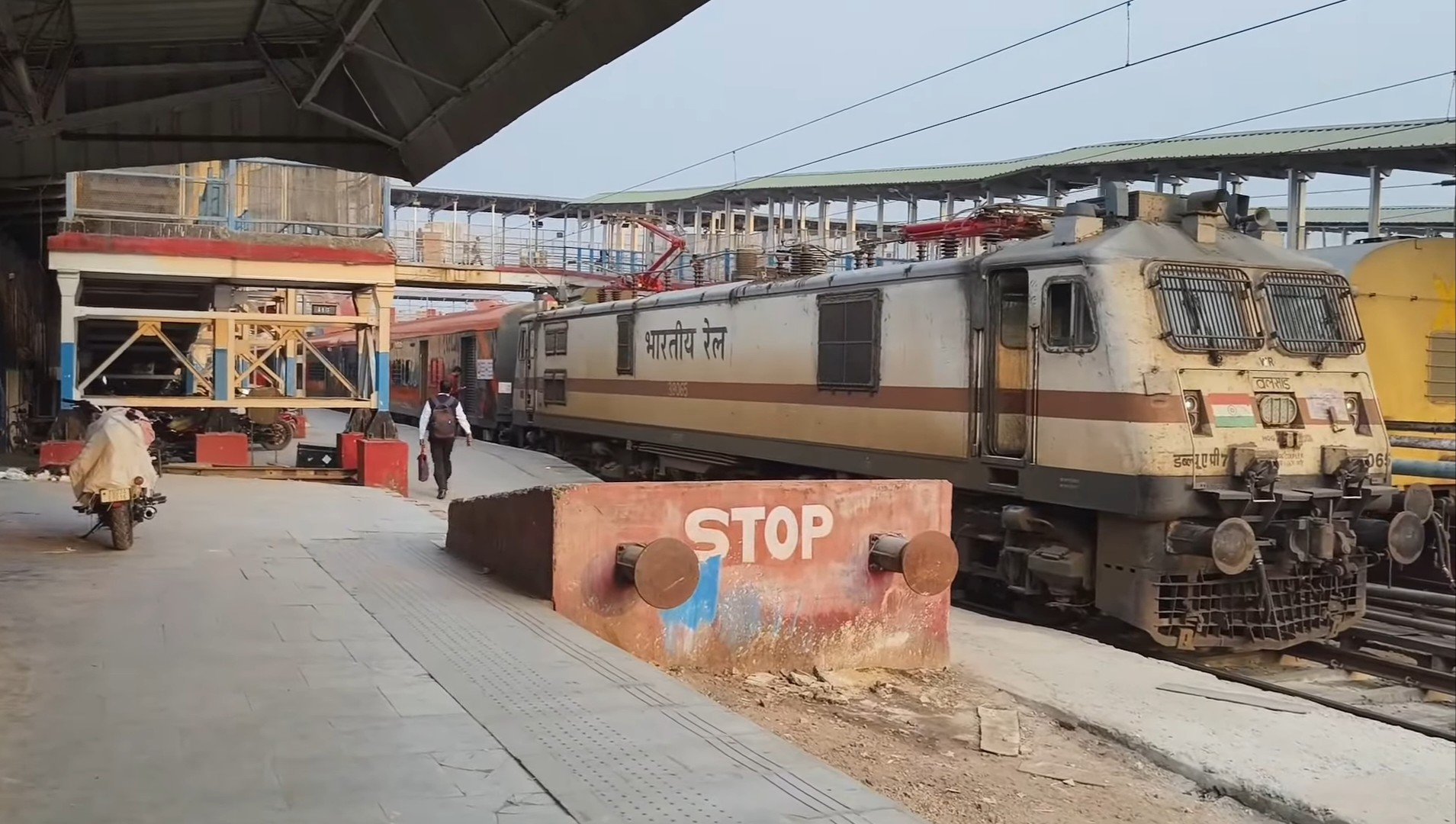
- TPJ–NJP standing on New Jalpaiguri Junction with Valsad – WAP-7

Overview
- Service type: Amrit Bharat Express, Superfast Express Train
- Status: Active
- Locale: Tamil Nadu, Andhra Pradesh, Odisha, Bihar and West Bengal
- First service: 17 January 2026; 3 months ago (Inaugural); 28 January 2026; 3 months ago (Commercial)
- Current operator: Southern Railways (SR)

Route
- Termini: Tiruchchirappalli Junction (TPJ); New Jalpaiguri Junction (NJP)
- Stops: 41
- Distance travelled: 2,622 km (1,629 mi)
- Average journey time: 47 hrs 15 mins
- Service frequency: Weekly (Note: 20610 – Wednesdays | 20609 – Fridays)
- Train number: 20610 / 20609
- Lines used: Tiruchchirappalli–Thanjavur–Chennai Egmore line; Gudur–Vijayawada line; Vijayawada–Duvvada line; Visakhapatnam–Brahmapur –Khurda Road line; Cuttack–Kharagpur line; Dankuni–Rampurhat line; Barsoi–Kishanganj –New Jalpaiguri line

On-board services
- Class: Sleeper class coach (SL) General unreserved coach (GS)
- Seating arrangements: Yes
- Sleeping arrangements: Yes
- Catering facilities: On-board catering
- Observation facilities: Saffron-grey livery
- Entertainment facilities: On-board WiFi; Infotainment system; Electric outlets; Reading light; Seat pockets; Bottle holder; Tray table
- Baggage facilities: Overhead racks
- Other facilities: Kavach

Technical
- Rolling stock: Modern LHB coaches
- Track gauge: Indian gauge
- Electrification: 25 kV 50 Hz AC overhead line
- Operating speed: 55 km/h (34 mph) (Avg.)
- Track owner: Indian Railways
- Rake maintenance: Tiruchchirappalli Jn (TPJ)

The 20610/20609 Tiruchchirappalli–New Jalpaiguri Amrit Bharat Express is India's 18th Non-AC Superfast Amrit Bharat Express train, which runs across the states of Tamil Nadu, Andhra Pradesh, Odisha, Bihar and West Bengal by connecting the cleanest and ancient temple city of Tiruchchirappalli Junction with the Gateway of Northeast India, New Jalpaiguri Junction, the largest city innorthern West Bengal.

This express train is inaugurated on 17 January 2026 by Prime Minister Narendra Modi through video conference from Malda Town in India.

== Overview ==
This train is currently operated by Indian Railways, connecting Tiruchchirappalli Junction and New Jalpaiguri Junction. It is currently operated by Southern Railway with train numbers 20610/20609 on weekly basis.

== Schedule ==
Train schedule: Tiruchchirappalli ↔ New Jalpaiguri Amrit Bharat Express
Train no.	Station code	Departure station	Departure time	Departure day	Arrival station	Arrival hours
20610	TPJ	Tiruchchirappalli Junction	5:45 AM	New Jalpaiguri Junction	6:45 PM	47h 15m
20609	NJP	New Jalpaiguri Junction	10:20 PM	Tiruchchirappalli Junction	6:15 PM	47 30m

== Route and halts ==
Routes and halts of Tiruchchirappalli–New Jalpaiguri Amrit Bharat Express :
20610 TPJ → NJP	20609 NJP → TPJ
Tiruchchirappalli Junction	New Jalpaiguri Junction
Thanjavur Junction	Kishanganj
Kumbakonam	Barsoi Junction
Mayiladuthurai Junction	Malda Town
Chidambaram	Rampurhat Junction
Thirupathiripuliyur	Bolpur Shantiniketan
Viluppuram Junction	Barddhaman Junction
Chengalpattu Junction	Dankuni Junction
Tambaram	Andul
Chennai Egmore	Kharagpur Junction
Sullurupeta	Balasore
Nayudupeta	Bhadrak
Gudur Junction	Jajpur Keonjhar Road
Ongole	Cuttack Junction
Vijayawada Junction	Bhubaneswar
Rajahmundry	Khurda Road Junction
Duvvada	Balugaon
Visakhapatnam Junction	Brahmapur
Vizianagaram Junction	Ichchapuram
Srikakulam Road	Sompeta
Palasa	Palasa
Sompeta	Srikakulam Road
Ichchapuram	Vizianagaram Junction
Brahmapur	Visakhapatnam Junction
Balugaon	Duvvada
Khurda Road Junction	Rajahmundry
Bhubaneswar	Vijayawada Junction
Cuttack Junction	Ongole
Jajpur Keonjhar Road	Gudur Junction
Bhadrak	Nayudupeta
Balasore	Sullurupeta
Kharagpur Junction	Chennai Egmore
Andul	Tambaram
Dankuni Junction	Chengalpattu Junction
Barddhaman Junction	Viluppuram Junction
Bolpur Shantiniketan	Thirupathiripuliyur
Rampurhat Junction	Chidambaram
Malda Town	Mayiladuthurai Junction
Barsoi Junction	Kumbakonam
Kishanganj	Thanjavur Junction
New Jalpaiguri Junction	Tiruchchirappalli Junction

== Rakes ==
It is the 18th Amrit Bharat 2.0 Express train in which the locomotives were designed by Chittaranjan Locomotive Works (CLW) at Chittaranjan, West Bengal and the coaches were designed and manufactured by the Integral Coach Factory at Perambur, Chennai under the Make in India initiative.

== Rake reversal ==
The train reverses direction in Visakhapatnam.

== Traction ==
it can hauled by Royapuram or Valsad-based WAP-7 in case if Amrit Bharat WAP-5 is breakdown or loco failure.

== See also ==
- Amrit Bharat Express
- Vande Bharat Express
- Tejas Express
- Tiruchchirappalli Junction
- New Jalpaiguri Junction
- Nagercoil–New Jalpaiguri Amrit Bharat Express

== Notes ==
Runs a day in a week with both directions.
