= Bhubaneswar–Visakhapatnam Vande Bharat Express =

Mini Vande Bharat Express train route in India

Bhubaneswar – Visakhapatnam Junction Vande Bharat Express
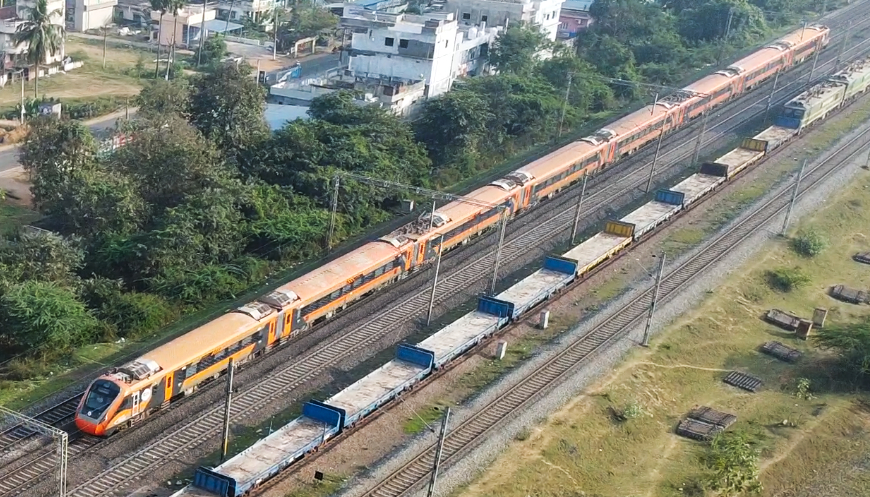
- Aerial view of the Bhubaneswar–Visakhapatnam Vande Bharat Express

Overview
- Service type: Vande Bharat Express
- Locale: Odisha and Andhra Pradesh
- First service: 12 March 2024 (Inaugural); 17 March 2024; 2 years ago (Commercial)
- Current operator: East Coast Railways (ECoR)

Route
- Termini: Bhubaneswar (BBS); Visakhapatnam Junction (VSKP)
- Stops: 7
- Distance travelled: 444 km (276 mi)
- Average journey time: 06 hrs
- Service frequency: Six days a week (Note: Except Saturdays)
- Train number: 20841 / 20842
- Line used: Khurda Road–Visakhapatnam section

On-board services
- Classes: AC Chair Car, AC Executive Chair Car
- Seating arrangements: Airline style; Rotatable seats
- Sleeping arrangements: No
- Catering facilities: On board Catering
- Observation facilities: Large windows in all coaches
- Entertainment facilities: On-board WiFi; Infotainment System; Electric outlets; Reading light; Seat Pockets; Bottle Holder; Tray Table
- Baggage facilities: Overhead racks
- Other facilities: Kavach

Technical
- Rolling stock: Mini Vande Bharat 2.0
- Track gauge: Indian gauge 1,676 mm (5 ft 6 in) broad gauge
- Electrification: 25 kV 50 Hz AC Overhead line
- Operating speed: 77 km/h (48 mph) (Avg.)
- Average length: 192 metres (630 ft) (08 coaches)
- Track owner: Indian Railways
- Rake maintenance: (TBC)

The 20841/20842 Bhubaneswar – Visakhapatnam Vande Bharat Express is India's 50th Vande Bharat Express train, connecting the metropolitan city of Odisha, Bhubaneswar with the city Visakhapatnam in Andhra Pradesh. This express train was inaugurated by Prime Minister Narendra Modi via video conferencing from Ahmedabad on March 12, 2024.

== Overview ==
This train will be operated by Indian Railways, connecting Bhubaneswar, Khurda Road Jn, Balugaon, Brahmapur, Ichchapuram, Palasa, Srikakulam Road, Vizianagaram Jn and Visakhapatnam Jn. It is operated with train numbers 20841/20842 on 6 days a week basis.

== Rakes ==
It is the forty-eighth 2nd Generation and thirty-third Mini Vande Bharat 2.0 Express train which was designed and manufactured by the Integral Coach Factory at Perambur, Chennai under the Make in India Initiative.

== Service ==
The 20841/20842 Bhubaneswar - Visakhapatnam Jn Vande Bharat Express operates six days a week except Mondays, covering a distance of 444 km (276 mi) in a travel time of 5 hours with an average speed of 77 km/h (48 mph). The service has 7 intermediate stops. The Maximum Permissible Speed is 130 km/h (81 mph).

== See also ==
- Vande Bharat Express
- Tejas Express
- Gatimaan Express
- Bhubaneswar railway station
- Visakhapatnam railway station
