= Bhubaneswar railway station =

Railway station in Odisha, India

BHUBANESWAR

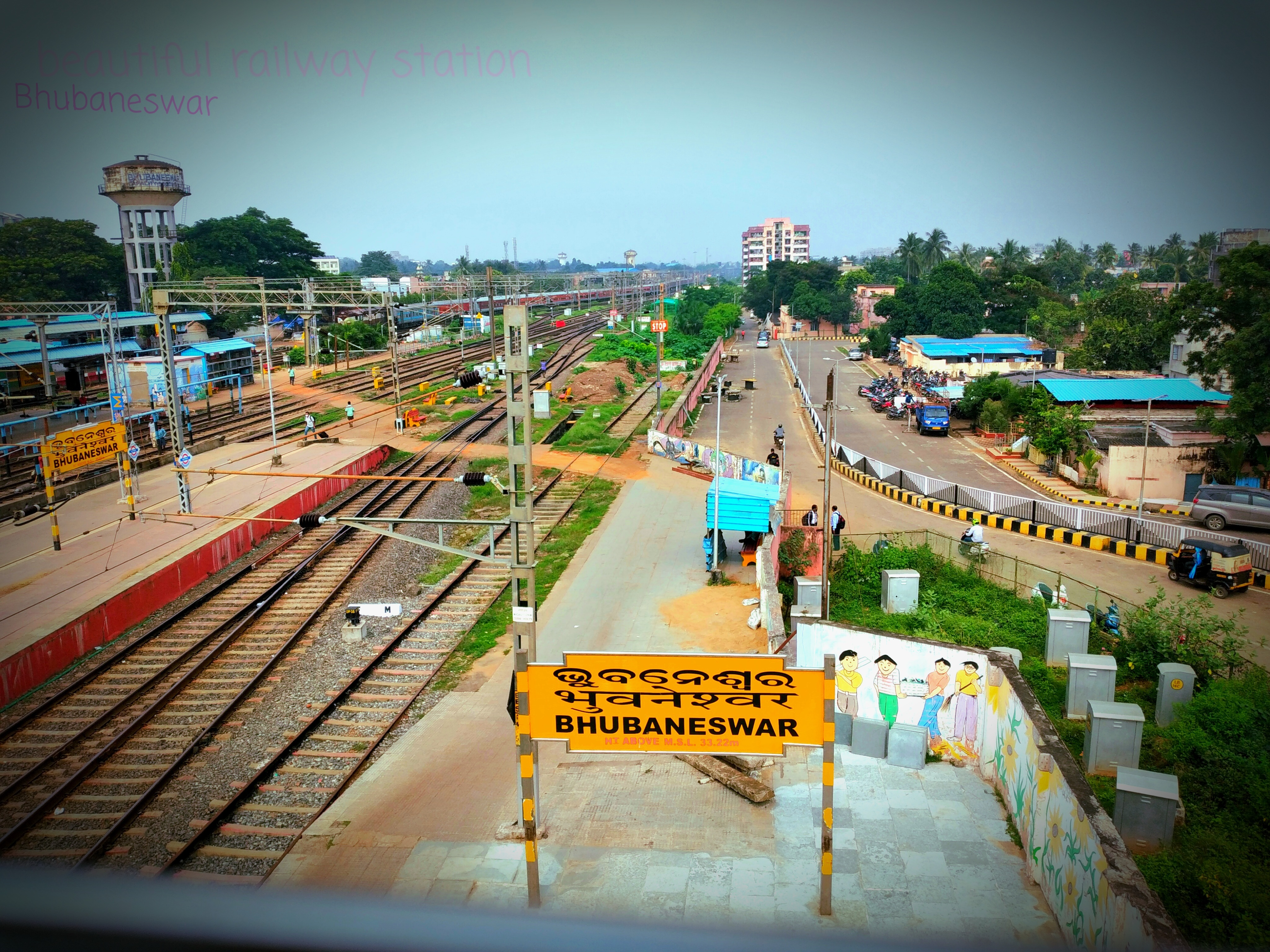
- Bhubaneswar Railway Station

General information
- Location: Master Canteen, Bhubaneswar, Odisha; India
- Coordinates: 20°15′56″N 85°50′35″E
- Elevation: 33.22 metres (109.0 ft)
- System: Indian Railways station
- Operator: Indian Railways
- Lines: Howrah–Chennai main line, Kharagpur–Puri line
- Platforms: 6
- Tracks: 8 (5ft 6in) broad gauge

Construction
- Structure type: Standard (on-ground station)
- Parking: Available
- Accessible: Yes

Other information
- Status: Functioning
- Station code: BBS
- Zone(s): East Coast Railway
- Division(s): Khurda Road

History
- Opened: 1896; 130 years ago
- Electrified: 2001; 25 years ago

Passengers
- Daily: 35603+

Services
Preceding station	Indian Railways	Following station
Vani Vihar towards Howrah Junction	East Coast Railway zone Howrah–Chennai main line	Lingaraj Temple Road towards Chennai Central
Location
- Location within Odisha Location within India
- Interactive map of Bhubaneswar

Bhubaneswar Railway Station (station code BBS) serves Bhubaneswar, the capital of the Indian state of Odisha. The headquarters of the East Coast Railway zone of the Indian Railways is located in Bhubaneswar. It comes under (NSG2) railway stations category of India.

== History ==
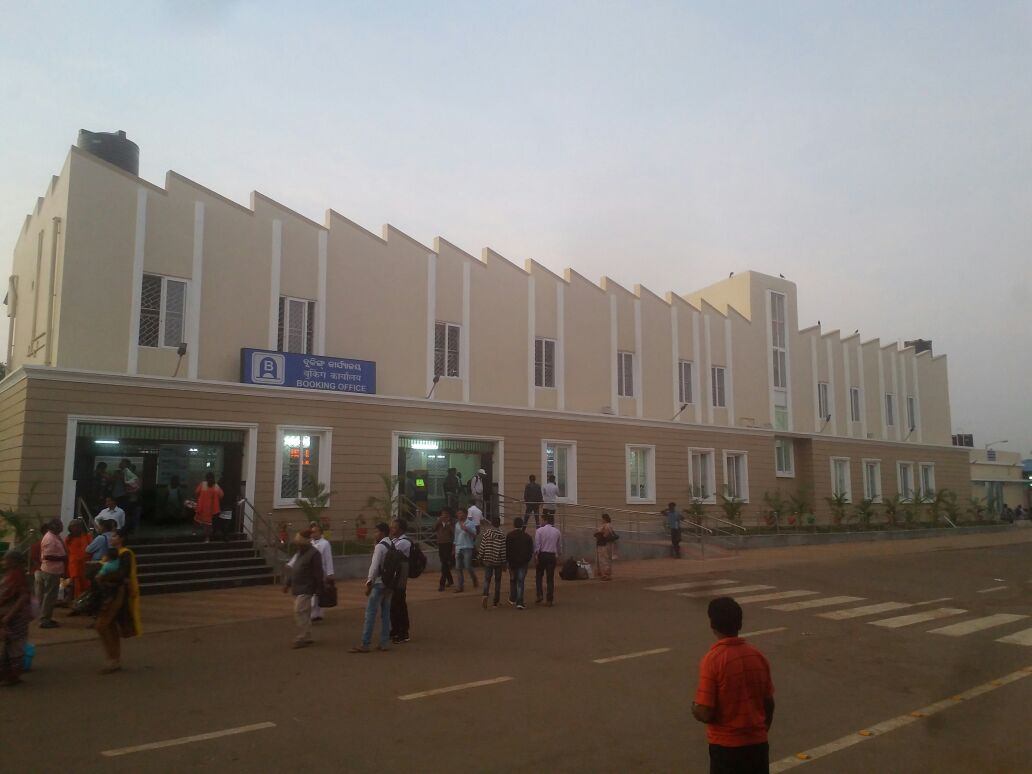
Second entrance to Bhubaneswar railway station towards platform no.6

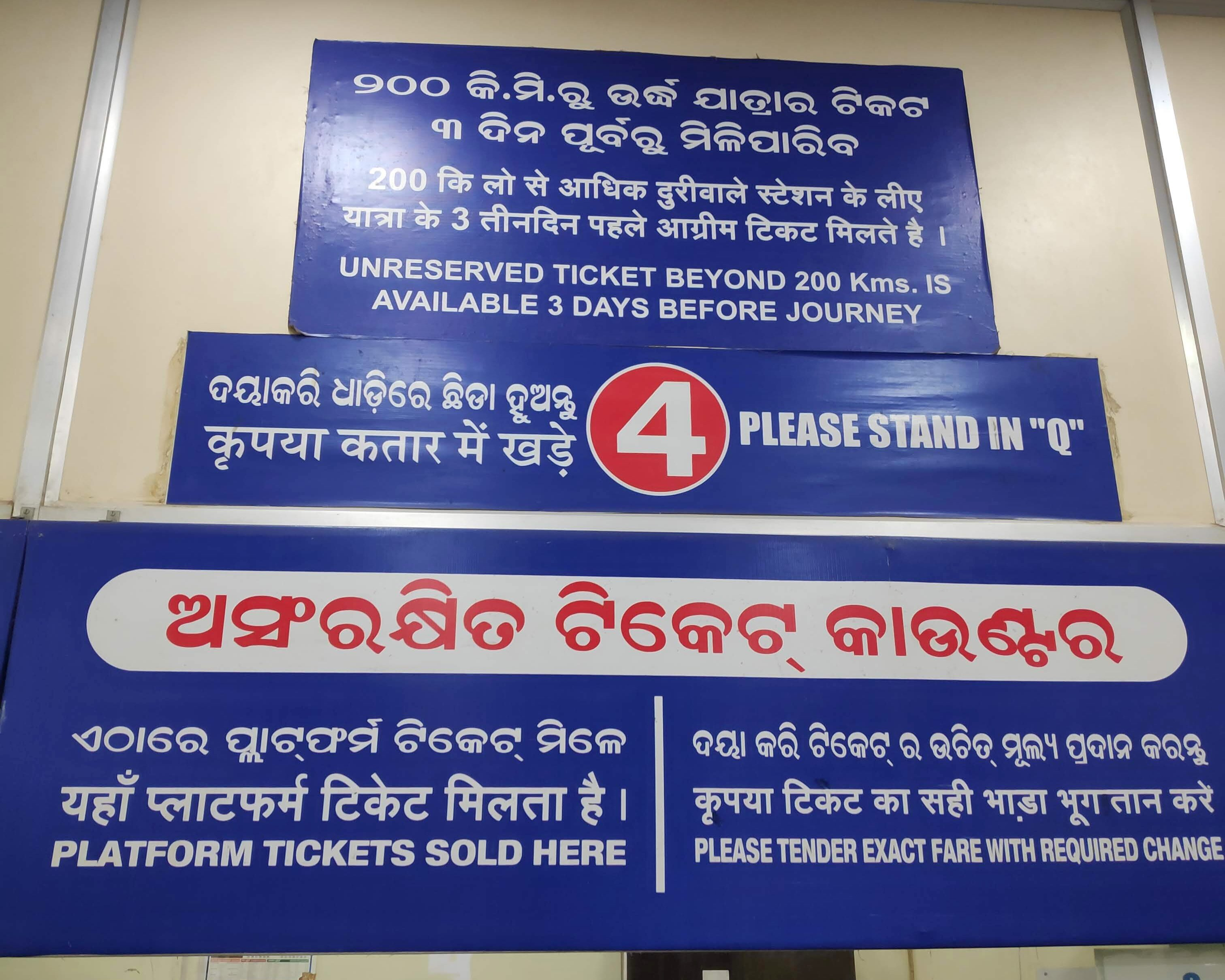
Bhubaneswar railway station Unreserved ticket counter

During the period 1893 to 1896, 800 miles of East Coast State Railway was built and opened to traffic. It necessitated construction of some of the largest bridges across rivers like Brahmani, Kathajodi, Kuakhai and Birupa.

Those days Cuttack was the capital of Orissa and Bhubaneswar was a village, a tehsil under Puri district. Since it was a tehsil a station was built. Later when Bhubaneswar became state capital in 1970, the previously existing station was improved. In 2001 it was electrified and platform no. 3 & 4 were opened.

== Major trains ==
Major trains available from Bhubaneswar are as follows:

● Bhubaneswar–Visakhapatnam Vande Bharat Express (20841/20842)

● Howrah–Puri Vande Bharat Express (22895/22896)

● Puri–Rourkela Vande Bharat Express (20835/20836)

● Tatanagar–Brahmapur Vande Bharat Express (20891/20892)

● Howrah–Puri Shatabdi Express (12277/12278)

● Bhubaneswar–New Delhi Duronto Express (12281/12282)

● Sir M. Visvesvaraya Terminal - Howrah Duronto Express (12245/12246)

● Sealdah–Puri Duronto Express (22201/22202)

● Bhubaneswar Tejas Rajdhani Express (Via Sambalpur City) (20817/20818)

● Bhubaneswar Tejas Rajdhani Express (Via Adra) (22811/22812)

● Bhubaneswar Tejas Rajdhani Express (Via Tatanagar) (22823/22824)

● Santragachi–Chennai Central AC Superfast Express (22807/22808)

● Shalimar–Secunderabad AC Superfast Express (12773/12774)

● Howrah–Tirupati Humsafar Express (20889/20890)

● Indore–Puri Humsafar Express (20917/20918)

● Sir M. Visvesvaraya Terminal - Kamakhya AC Superfast Express (12551/12552)

● Sir M. Visvesvaraya Terminal - Howrah AC Superfast Express (22863/22864)

● Sir M. Visvesvaraya Terminal - Bhubaneswar Humsafar Express (22833/22834)

● Sir M. Visvesvaraya Terminal - Agartala Humsafar Express (12503/12504)

● Sir M. Visvesvaraya Terminal - Howrah Humsafar Express (22887/22888)

● Sir M. Visvesvaraya Terminal - Bhubaneswar Superfast Express (12845/12846)

● Sir M. Visvesvaraya Terminal - Howrah Superfast Express (12863/12864)

● Sir M. Visvesvaraya Terminal - Alipurduar Amrit Bharat Express (16597/16598)

● Sir M. Visvesvaraya Terminal - Malda Town Amrit Bharat Express (13433/13434)

● Sir M. Visvesvaraya Terminal - Guwahati Kaziranga Superfast Express (12509/12510)

● Sir M.Visvesvaraya Terminal - New Tinsukia Express (22501/22502)

● Sir M.Visvesvaraya Terminal - Balurghat Express (16523/16524)

● Sir M.Visvesvaraya Terminal - Radhikapur Express (16223/16224)

● Sir M. Visvesvaraya Terminal - Bhagalpur Anga Express (12253/12254)

● Sir M. Visvesvaraya Terminal - Muzaffarpur Express (15227/15228)

● Sir M. Visvesvaraya Terminal - Jasidih Express (22305/22306)

● KSR Bangalore - Bhubaneswar Prashanti Express (18463/18464)

● Bhubaneswar - Secunderabad Konark Express (11019/11020)

● Bhubaneswar–Howrah Jan Shatabdi Express (12073/12074)

● Bhubaneswar - Anand Vihar Terminal Odisha Sampark Kranti Express (12819/12820)

● Lokmanya Tilak Terminus–Bhubaneswar Superfast Express (12879/12880)

● Bhubaneswar–Bolangir Intercity Superfast Express (12893/12894)

● Bhubaneswar - Secunderabad Visakha Express (17015/17016)

● Bhubaneswar - Jagdalpur Hirakhand Express (18447/18448)

● Bhubaneswar–Junagarh Express (20837/20838)

● Rameswaram–Bhubaneswar Express (20849/20850)

● Puducherry–Bhubaneswar Superfast Express (20851/20852)

● Bhubaneswar–Chennai Central Express (20853/20854)

● Bhubaneswar–Anand Vihar Weekly Superfast Express (22805/22806)

● Bhubaneshwar–Visakhapatnam Intercity Express (22819/22820)

● Rourkela–Bhubaneswar Intercity Express (22839/22840)

● Bhubaneswar–Tirupati Superfast Express (22871/22872)

● Pune–Bhubaneswar Express (22881/22882)

● Tiruchchirappalli–New Jalpaiguri Amrit Bharat Express (20609/20610)

● Nagercoil–New Jalpaiguri Amrit Bharat Express (20603/20604)

● Charlapalli–Kamakhya Amrit Bharat Express (15673/15674)

● MGR Chennai Central – New Jalpaiguri Superfast Express (22611/22612)

● Silchar - Thiruvananthapuram Aronai Superfast Express (12507/12508)

● Silchar - Coimbatore Superfast Express (12515/12516)

● Dibrugarh–Kanyakumari Vivek Express (22503/22504)

● Silchar–Secunderabad Express (12513/12514)

● Puri–Kamakhya Weekly Express (via Howrah) (15643/15644)

● Puri–Kamakhya Weekly Express (via Adra) (15639/15640)

● Chennai Tambaram - Silghat Town Nagaon Express (15629/15630)

● Chennai Tambaram - New Tinsukia Express (15929/15930)

● Shalimar - Puri Sri Jagannath Express (18409/18410)

● Howrah–Vasco da Gama Amaravati Express (18047/18048)

● Howrah–Sathya Sai Prasanthi Nilayam Express (22831/22832)

● Howrah–Mysore Express (22817/22818)

● Howrah - Secunderabad Falaknuma Express (12703/12704)

● Howrah - Puri Dhauli Express (12821/12822)

● Shalimar - Charlapalli East Coast Express (18045/18046)

● Shalimar–Chennai Central Weekly Superfast Express (22825/22826)

● Santragachi–Tirupati Express (22855/22856)

● Santragachi–Mangaluru Central Vivek Express (22851/22852)

● Howrah - MGR Chennai Central Coromandel Express (12841/12842)

● Howrah–Kanyakumari Express (12665/12666)

● Tiruchirappalli–Howrah Superfast Express (12663/12664)

● Puri–Howrah Express (12837/12838)

● Shalimar–Puri Express (22835/22836)

● Charlapalli–Shalimar Amrit Bharat Express (17065/17066)

● Howrah–Puducherry Express (12867/12868)

● Howrah - Nagercoil Gurudev Express (12659/12660)

● Howrah–Chennai Mail (12839/12840)

● Thiruvananthpuram–Shalimar Express (22641/22642)

● Tambaram–Santragachi Amrit Bharat Express (16107/16108)

● Puri–Shalimar Garib Rath Express (12881/12882)

● Paradeep–Visakhapatnam Express (22809/22810)

● Puri - Patna Baidyanath dham Express (18449/18450)

● Puri–Jaynagar Express (18419/18420)

● Puri - Rishikesh Kalinga Utkal Express (18477/18478)

● Puri - New Delhi Purushottam Express (12801/12802)

● Digha–Visakhapatnam Express (22873/22874)

● Lokmanya Tilak Terminus–Puri Superfast Express (via Titlagarh) (12145/12146)

● Puri - Hatia Tapaswini Express (18451/18452)

● Puri - Anand Vihar Terminal Nandan Kanan Express (12815/12816)

● Puri - Anand Vihar Terminal Neelachal Express (12875/12876)

● Puri - Mumbai CSMT Konark Express (11019/11020)

● Lokmanya Tilak Terminus–Puri Superfast Express (22865/21866)

● Puri–Durg Express (18425/18426)

● Puri–Surat Express (22827/22828)

● Puri–Sainagar Shirdi Express (20857/20858)

● Puri–Ahmedabad Weekly Express (20861/20862)

● Rourkela–Gunupur Rajya Rani Express (18117/18118)

● Ernakulam–Patna Superfast Express (via Asansol) (22643/22644)

● Visakhapatnam–Tatanagar Weekly Superfast Express (20815/20816)

● Gandhidham–Puri Weekly Superfast Express (12993/12994)

● Kharagpur–Villupuram Superfast Express (22603/22604)

● Purulia–Villupuram Superfast Express (22605/22606)

● Bikaner–Puri Express (20471/20472)

● Valsad–Puri Superfast Express (22909/22910)

● Puri–Barbil Express (18415/18416)

● Paradeep–Puri Intercity Express (18413/18414)

● Jodhpur-Puri Superfast Express (20814/20815)

● Bangriposi - Puri Intercity Express (12891/12892)

● Rourkela - Puri Express (18125/18126)

● Anand Vihar - Puri Superfast Express (18428/18429)

● Puri - Ajmer Express (20823/20824)

● Kharagpur - Khurda Road Express (18021/18022)

● Puri - Sonepur Express (18421/18422)

● Howrah–Ernakulam Antyodaya Express (22877/22878)

● Santragachi–Tambaram Antyodaya Express (22841/22842)

● Puri - Digha Samudra Kanya Express (22889/22890)

● Sambalpur–Puri Intercity Express (18303/18304)
