= Bhubaneswar–SMVT Bengaluru Weekly Superfast Express =

Train in India

Overview
- Service type: Superfast
- Current operator: East Coast Railway zone

Route
- Termini: Bhubaneswar (BBS); Sir M. Visvesvaraya Terminal, Bengaluru (SMVB)
- Stops: 16
- Distance travelled: 1,511 km (939 mi)
- Average journey time: 27h 20m
- Service frequency: Weekly (Note: Runs one day in a week for every direction.)
- Train number: 12845/12846

On-board services
- Classes: AC 2 tier, AC 3 tier, Sleeper class, General Unreserved
- Seating arrangements: No
- Sleeping arrangements: Yes
- Catering facilities: On-board catering E-catering
- Observation facilities: ICF coach
- Entertainment facilities: No
- Baggage facilities: No
- Other facilities: Below the seats

Technical
- Rolling stock: 2
- Track gauge: 1,676 mm (5 ft 6 in)
- Operating speed: 55 km/h (34 mph), including halts
Route map
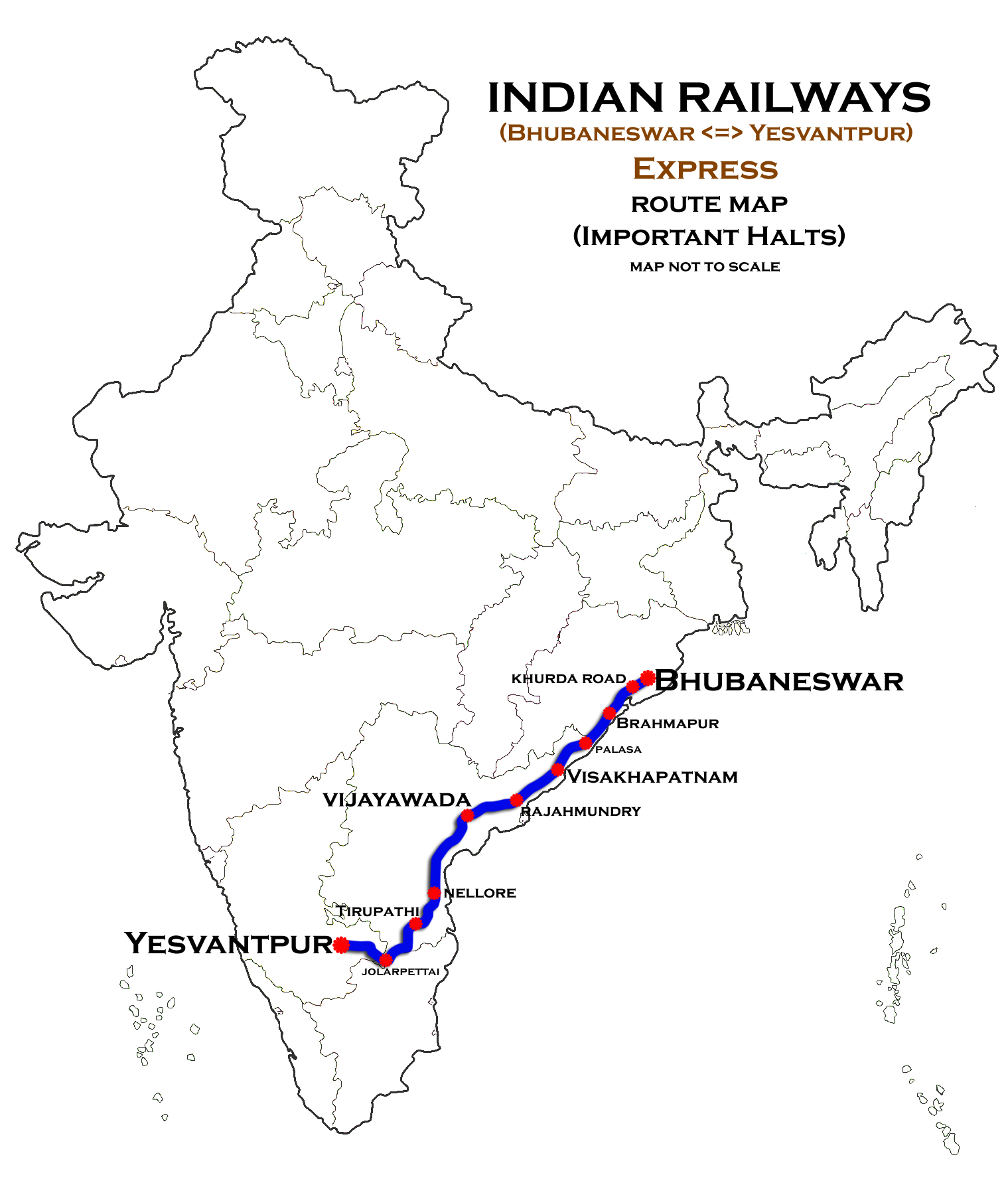

Bhubaneswar–SMVT Bengaluru Weekly Superfast Express is a Superfast train belonging to East Coast Railway zone that runs between Bhubaneswar and Sir M. Visvesvaraya Terminal, Bengaluru in India. It is currently being operated with 12845/12846 train numbers on a weekly basis.

== Service ==
The 12845/Bhubaneswar–Bengaluru Cantt. Superfast Express has an average speed of 49 km/h and covers 1511 km in 27h 20m. The 12845/Bhubaneswar–Bengaluru Cantt. Superfast Express has an average speed of 56 km/h and covers 1511 km in 26h 45m.

== Route and halts ==
The important halts of the train are:

- Bhubaneswar
- Khurda Road Junction
- Brahmapur
- Vizianagaram Junction
- Visakhapatnam Junction
- Vijayawada Junction
- Rajahmundry
- Renigunta Junction
- Tirupati
- Jolarpettai Junction
- Whitefield
- Krishnarajapuram
- Sir M. Visvesvaraya Terminal

== Coach composition ==
The train has standard LHB rakes with max speed of 110 kmph. The train consists of 23 coaches:

- 2 AC II Tier
- 3 AC III Tier
- 11 Sleeper coaches
- 1 Pantry car
- 4 General Unreserved
- 2 Seating cum Luggage Rake

== Traction ==
Both trains are hauled by a Visakhapatnam Loco Shed-based WAP-4 electric locomotive from Bhubaneswar to Visakhapatnam. From Visakhapatnam trains are hauled by an Erode Loco Shed-based WAP-4 electric locomotive from Bhubaneswar and vice versa.

== Rake sharing ==
The train shares its rake with 12829/12830 Bhubaneswar–Chennai Central Express.

== Direction reversal ==
The train reverses its direction 1 times:

- Visakhapatnam Junction

== Schedule ==
Train number	Station code	Departure station	Departure time	Departure day	Arrival station	Arrival time	Arrival day
12845	BBS	Bhubaneswar	7:30 AM	Sunday	Bangalore Cantonment	10:50 AM	Monday
12846	BNC	Bangalore Cantonment	8:25 AM	Tuesday	Bhubaneswar	11:15 AM	Wednesday

== See also ==
- Bangalore Cantonment railway station
- Bhubaneswar railway station
- Bhubaneswar–Chennai Central Express
