= Nagercoil–New Jalpaiguri Amrit Bharat Express =

Amrit Bharat Express train route in India

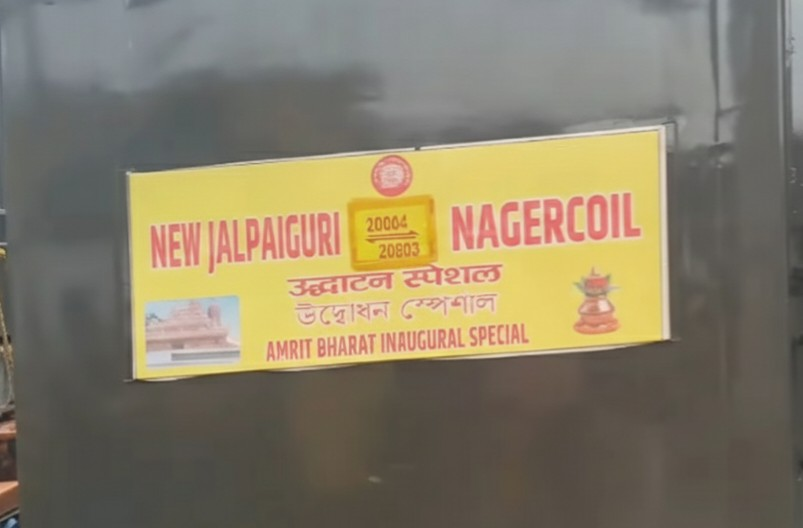

Overview
- Service type: Amrit Bharat Express, Superfast Express Train
- Status: Active
- Locale: Tamil Nadu, Andhra Pradesh, Odisha, Bihar and West Bengal
- First service: 17 January 2026; 7 months ago (Inaugural); 25 January 2026; 6 months ago (Commercial)
- Current operator: Southern Railways (SR)

Route
- Termini: Nagercoil Junction (NCJ); New Jalpaiguri Junction (NJP)
- Stops: 45
- Distance travelled: 3,102 km (1,927 mi)
- Average journey time: 54 hrs
- Service frequency: Weekly (Note: 20604 – Sundays | 20603 – Wednesdays)
- Train number: 20604 / 20603
- Lines used: Nagercoil–Tirunelveli line; Virudhunagar Junction–Vanchi Maniyachchi line; Madurai Junction–Chennai Egmore line; Coimbatore–Pollachi line; Jolarpettai–Shoranur line; Gudur–Katpadi section; Duvvada–Vijayawada section; Khurda Road–Visakhapatnam section; Cuttack–Kharagpur line; Dankuni–Rampurhat line; Malda Town–Barsoi line; Kishanganj–New Jalpaiguri line

On-board services
- Class: Sleeper class coach (SL) General unreserved coach (GS)
- Seating arrangements: Yes
- Sleeping arrangements: Yes
- Catering facilities: On-board catering
- Observation facilities: Saffron-grey livery
- Entertainment facilities: On-board WiFi; Infotainment system; Electric outlets; Reading light; Seat pockets; Bottle holder; Tray table
- Baggage facilities: Overhead racks
- Other facilities: Kavach

Technical
- Rolling stock: Modified LHB coaches
- Track gauge: Indian gauge
- Electrification: 25 kV 50 Hz AC overhead line
- Operating speed: 57 km/h (35 mph) (Avg.)
- Track owner: Indian Railways
- Rake maintenance: Nagercoil Jn. (NCJ) - Primary; New Jalpaiguri Junction - Secondary

The 20604/20603 Nagercoil–New Jalpaiguri Amrit Bharat Express is India's 16th Non-AC Superfast Amrit Bharat Express train, which runs across the states of Tamil Nadu, Andhra Pradesh, Odisha, Bihar and West Bengal by connecting the Nagas Temple City Nagercoil Junction with the Gateway of Northeast India, New Jalpaiguri Junction the largest city in Northern West Bengal.

This express train is inaugurated on 17 January 2026 by Prime Minister Narendra Modi via video conference from Malda Town in India.

== Overview ==
This train is currently operated by Indian Railways, connecting Nagercoil Junction and New Jalpaiguri Junction. It is currently operated with train numbers 20604/20603 on a weekly basis.

== Schedule ==
Train schedule: Nagercoil ↔ New Jalpaiguri Amrit Bharat Express
Train no.	Station code	Departure station	Departure time	Departure day	Arrival station	Arrival hours
20604	NCJ	Nagercoil Junction	11:00 PM	New Jalpaiguri Junction	5:00 AM	54h 0m
20603	NJP	New Jalpaiguri Junction	6:45 PM	Nagercoil Junction	11:00 PM	54h 15m

== Routes and halts ==
The halts for this 20604/20603 Nagercoil Junction – New Jalpaiguri Junction Amrit Bharat Express are as follows:-

1. Nagercoil Junction
2. Tirunelveli Junction
3. Kovilpatti
4. Satur
5. Virudhunagar Junction
6. Madurai Junction
7. Dindigul Junction
8. Palani
9. Udumalaipettai
10. Pollachi Junction
11. Coimbatore Junction
12. Tiruppur
13. Erode Junction
14. Salem Junction
15. Jolarpettai Junction
16. Katpadi Junction
17. Renigunta Junction
18. Gudur Junction
19. Ongole
20. Vijayawada Junction
21. Rajahmundry
22. Duvvada
23. Visakhapatnam Junction
  (Reversal)
24. Vizianagaram Junction
25. Srikakulam Road
26. Palasa
27. Sompeta
28. Ichchapuram
29. Brahmapur
30. Balugaon
31. Khurda Road Junction
32. Bhubaneswar
33. Cuttack Junction
34. Jajpur Keonjhar Road
35. Bhadrak
36. Balasore
37. Kharagpur Junction
38. Andul
39. Dankuni Junction
40. Bolpur Shantiniketan
41. Rampurhat Junction
42. Malda Town
43. Barsoi Junction
44. Kishanganj
45. New Jalpaiguri Junction|colwidth=15em}}

== Rakes ==
It is the 16th Amrit Bharat 2.0 Express train in which the locomotives were designed by Chittaranjan Locomotive Works (CLW) at Chittaranjan, West Bengal and the coaches were designed and manufactured by the Integral Coach Factory at Perambur, Chennai under the Make in India initiative.

== Rake reversal ==
The train reverses direction in Visakhapatnam.

== See also ==
- Amrit Bharat Express
- Vande Bharat Express
- Tejas Express
- Nagercoil Junction
- New Jalpaiguri Junction

== Notes ==
Runs a day in a week with both directions.
