= Balugaon railway station =

Railway station in Odisha, India

Balugaon
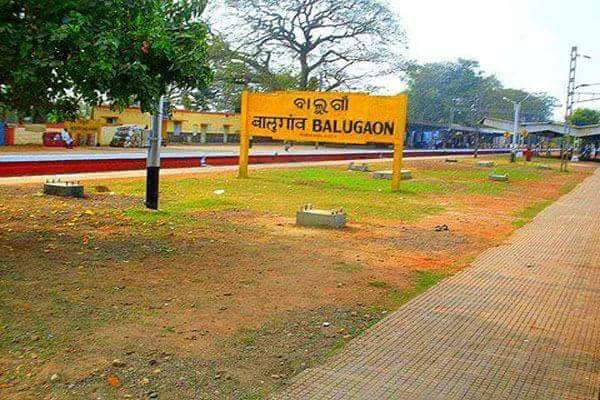

General information
- Location: Balugaon, Odisha; India
- Coordinates: 19°44′50″N 85°12′03″E
- Elevation: 9 metres (30 ft)
- System: Indian Railways station
- Owner: Ministry of Railways, Indian Railways
- Line: Howrah–Chennai main line
- Platforms: 4
- Tracks: 4

Construction
- Structure type: Standard (on ground)
- Parking: yes

Other information
- Status: Functioning
- Station code: BALU
- Zone(s): East Coast Railway
- Division(s): Khurda Road
Location
- Location within India Location within Odisha

Balugaon railway station is a railway station on the East Coast Railway network in the state of Odisha, India. It serves Balugaon town. Its code is BALU. It has four platforms. Passenger, MEMU, Express and Superfast trains halt at Balugaon railway station.

== Major trains ==
- Tiruchchirappalli–New Jalpaiguri Amrit Bharat Express
- Nagercoil–New Jalpaiguri Amrit Bharat Express
- SMVT Bengaluru–Alipurduar Amrit Bharat Express
- Charlapalli–Kamakhya Amrit Bharat Express
- Guwahati–Bengaluru Cantt. Superfast Express
- Guwahati–Secunderabad Express
- Thiruvananthapuram–Silchar Superfast Express
- Ernakulam–Patna Express (via Chennai)
- Santragachi–Chennai Central Antyodaya Express
- Paradeep–Visakhapatnam Express
- Konark Express
- Gurudev Express
- Thiruvananthapuram–Silchar Superfast Express
- Yesvantpur–Muzaffarpur Weekly Express
- Thiruvananthpuram–Shalimar Express
- Howrah–Yesvantpur Superfast Express
- Hirakud Express
- Hirakhand Express
- East Coast Express
- Puri–Ahmedabad Express
- Prashanti Express
- Bhubaneswar–Tirupati Superfast Express
- Puri–Okha Dwarka Express
- Rourkela–Gunupur Rajya Rani Express
- Howrah–Chennai Mail
- Bhubaneswar–Bangalore Cantonment Superfast Express
- Falaknuma Express
- Bhubaneshwar–Visakhapatnam Intercity Express
- Visakha Express
- Puri–Tirupati Express
- Puducherry–Bhubaneswar Superfast Express
- Bhubaneswar–Chennai Central Express
- Visakhapatnam–Tatanagar Weekly Superfast Express
- Gandhidham–Puri Weekly Express

== Gallery ==
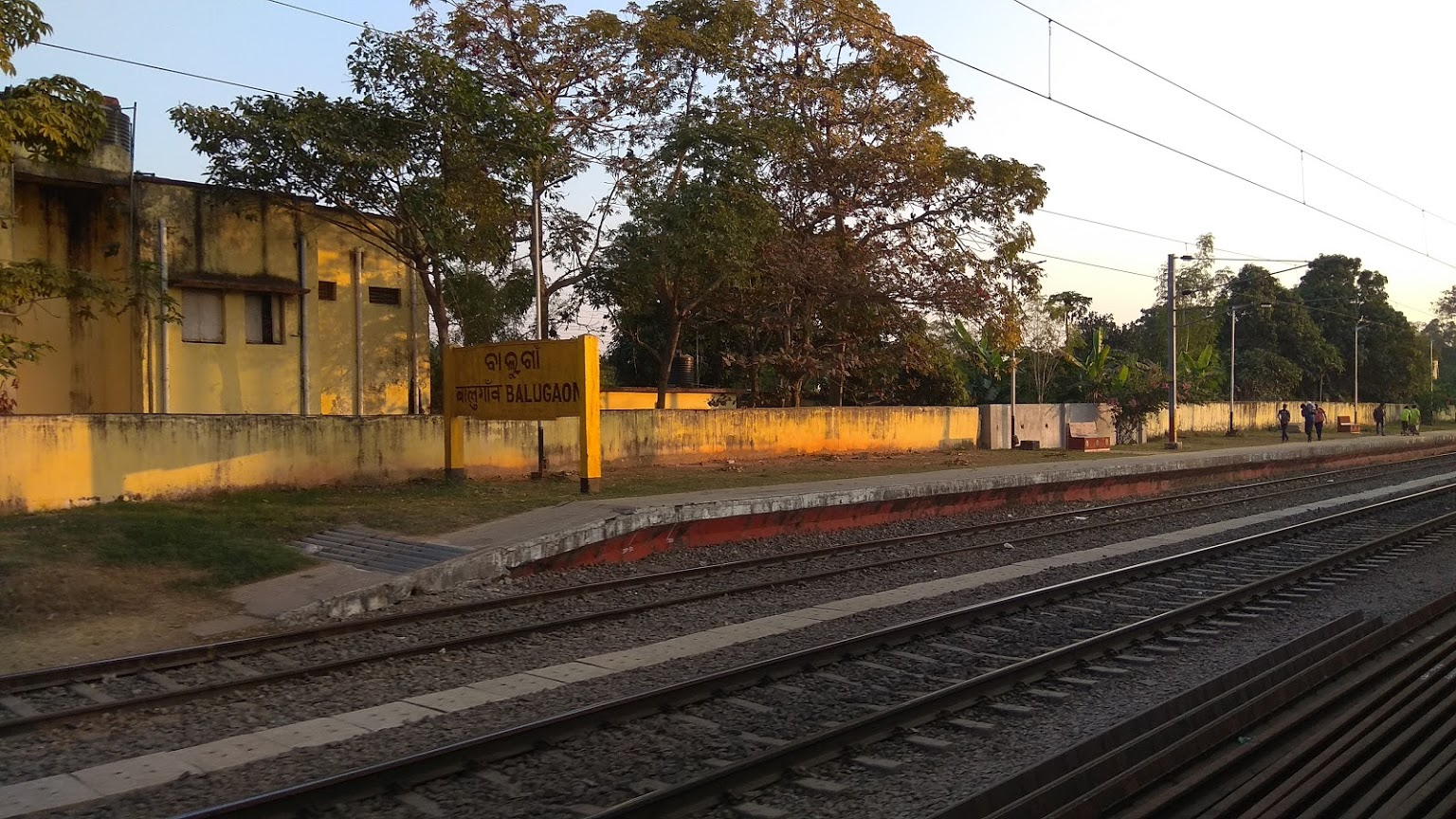
Balugaon railway station

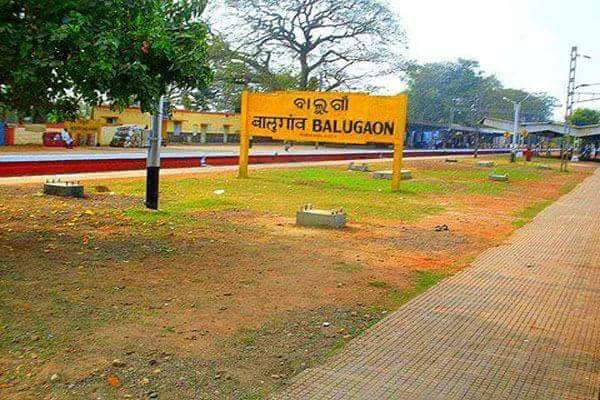
Balugaon railway station

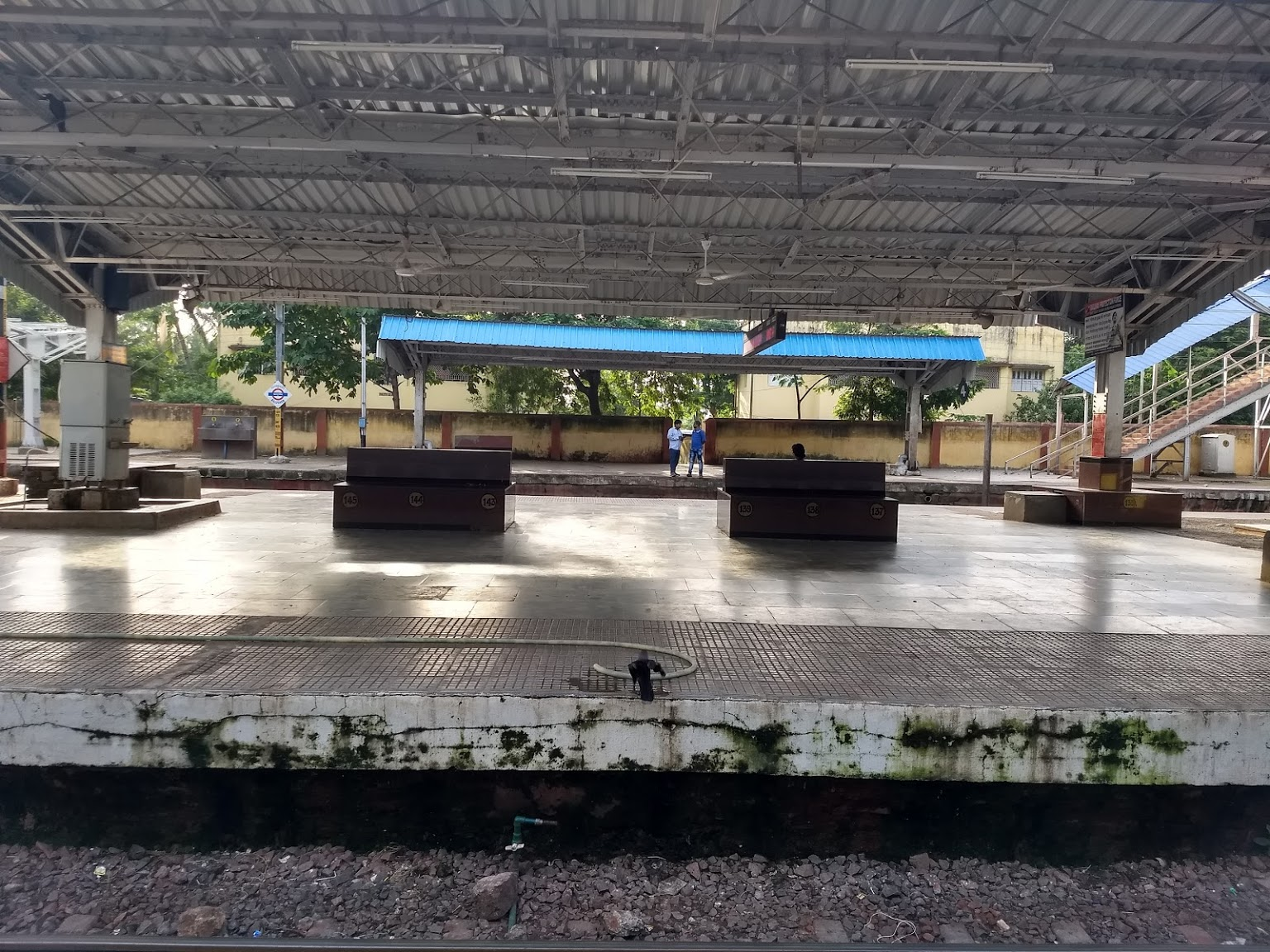
Balugaon railway station

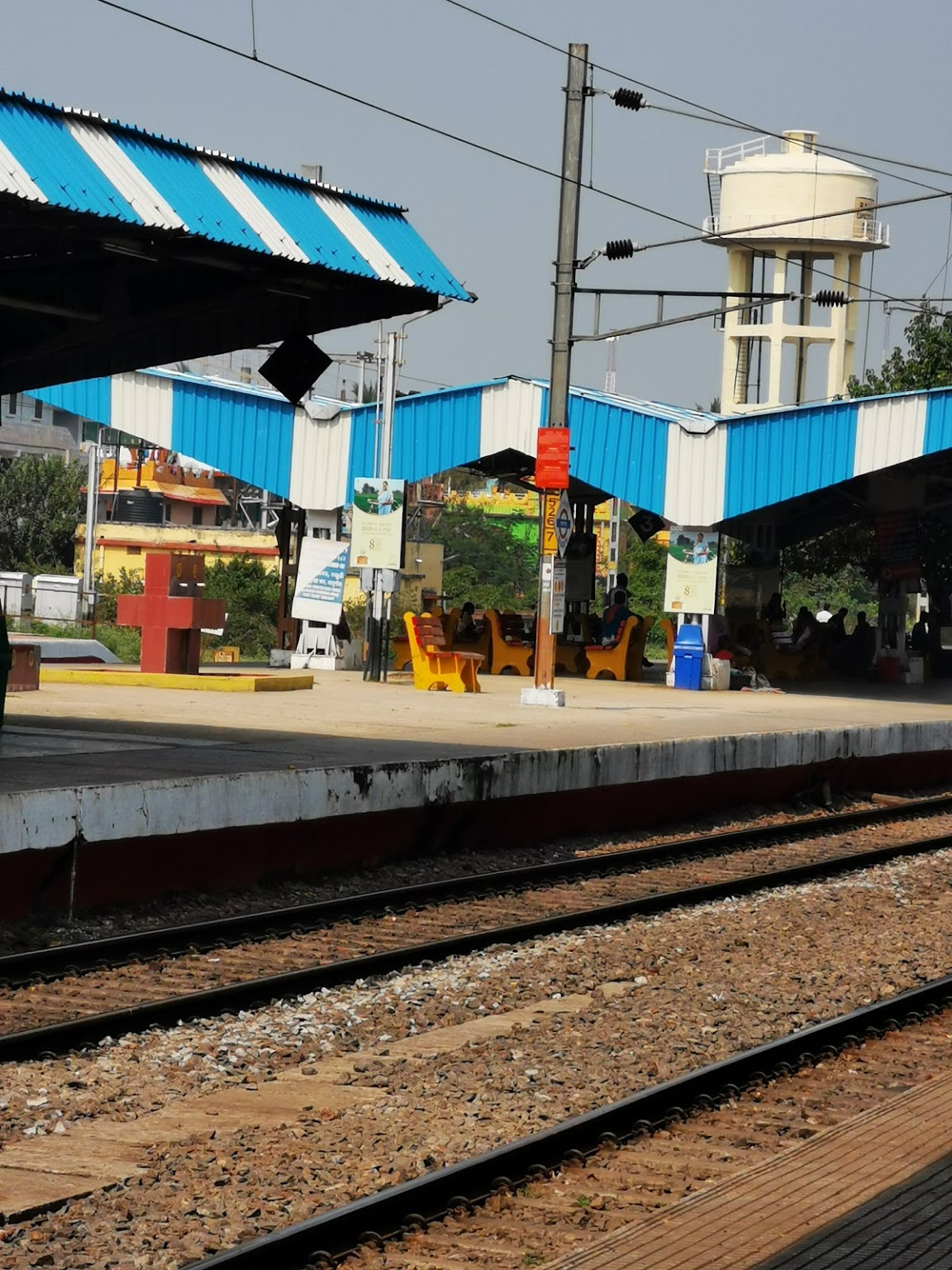
Balugaon railway station

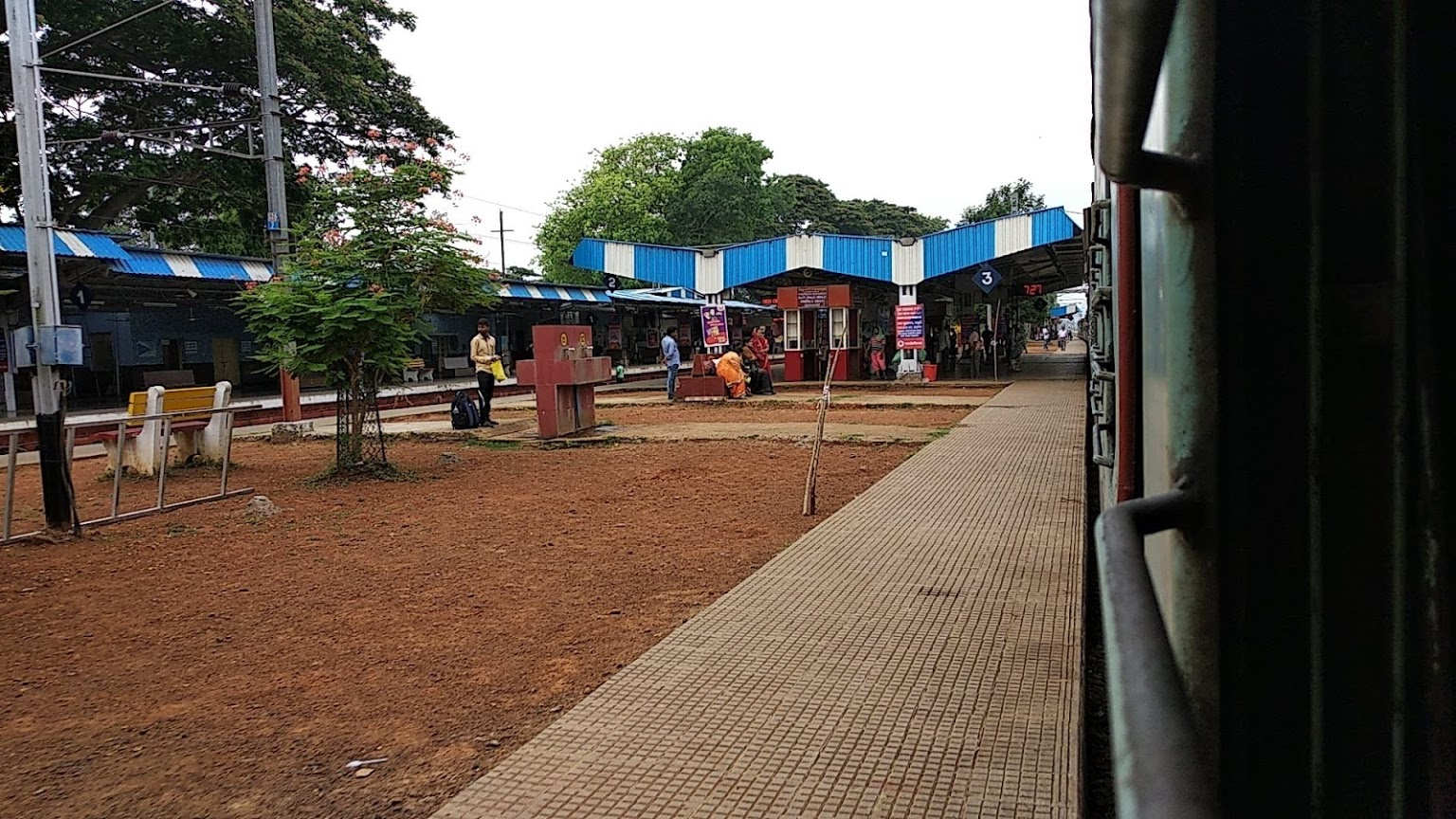
Balugaon railway station

== See also ==
- Khordha district
