= Puducherry–Bhubaneswar Superfast Express =

Train in India

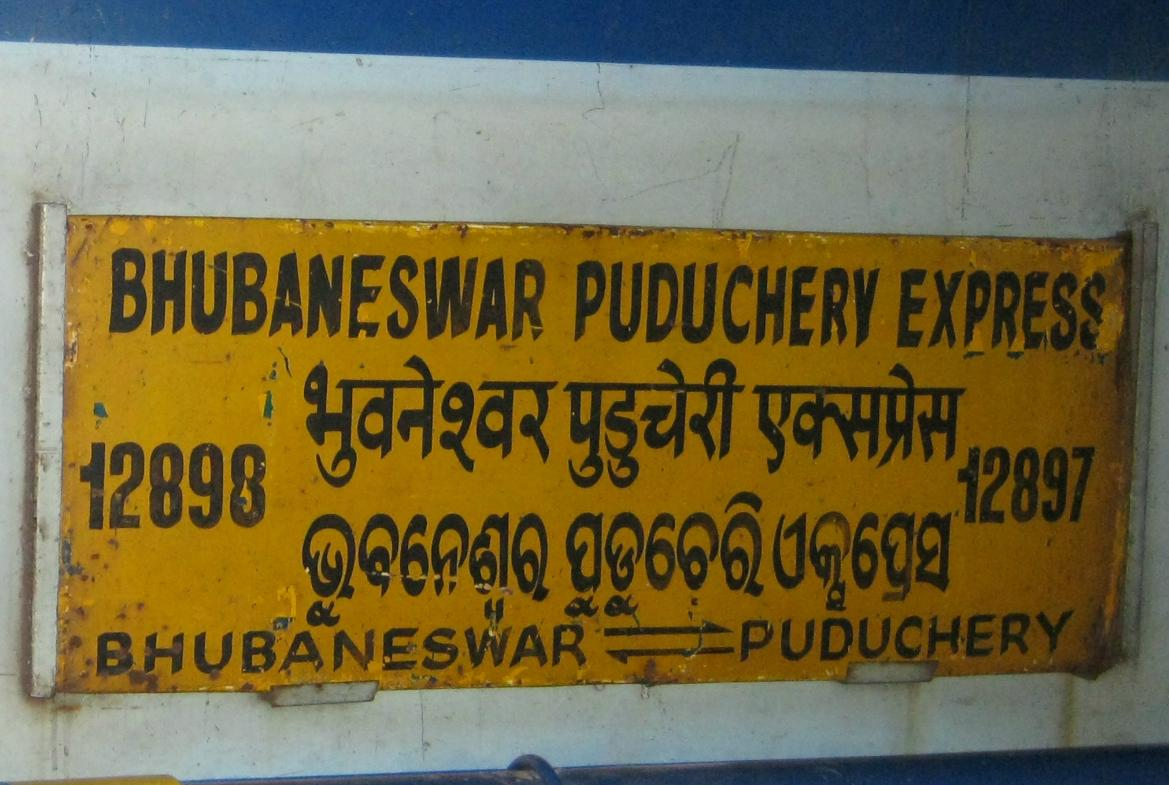

Overview
- Service type: Superfast
- First service: 21 February 2007; 19 years ago
- Current operator: East Coast Railway zone

Route
- Termini: Puducherry (PDY); Bhubaneswar (BBS)
- Stops: 17
- Distance travelled: 1,426 km (886 mi)
- Average journey time: 24h
- Service frequency: Weekly (Note: Runs one day in a week for every direction.)
- Train number: 22907/22908

On-board services
- Classes: AC 2 tier, AC 3 tier, Sleeper class, General Unreserved
- Seating arrangements: No
- Sleeping arrangements: Yes
- Catering facilities: On-board catering E-catering
- Observation facilities: LHB coach
- Entertainment facilities: No
- Baggage facilities: No
- Other facilities: Below the seats

Technical
- Rolling stock: 2
- Track gauge: 1,676 mm (5 ft 6 in)
- Operating speed: 59 km/h (37 mph), including halts
Route map
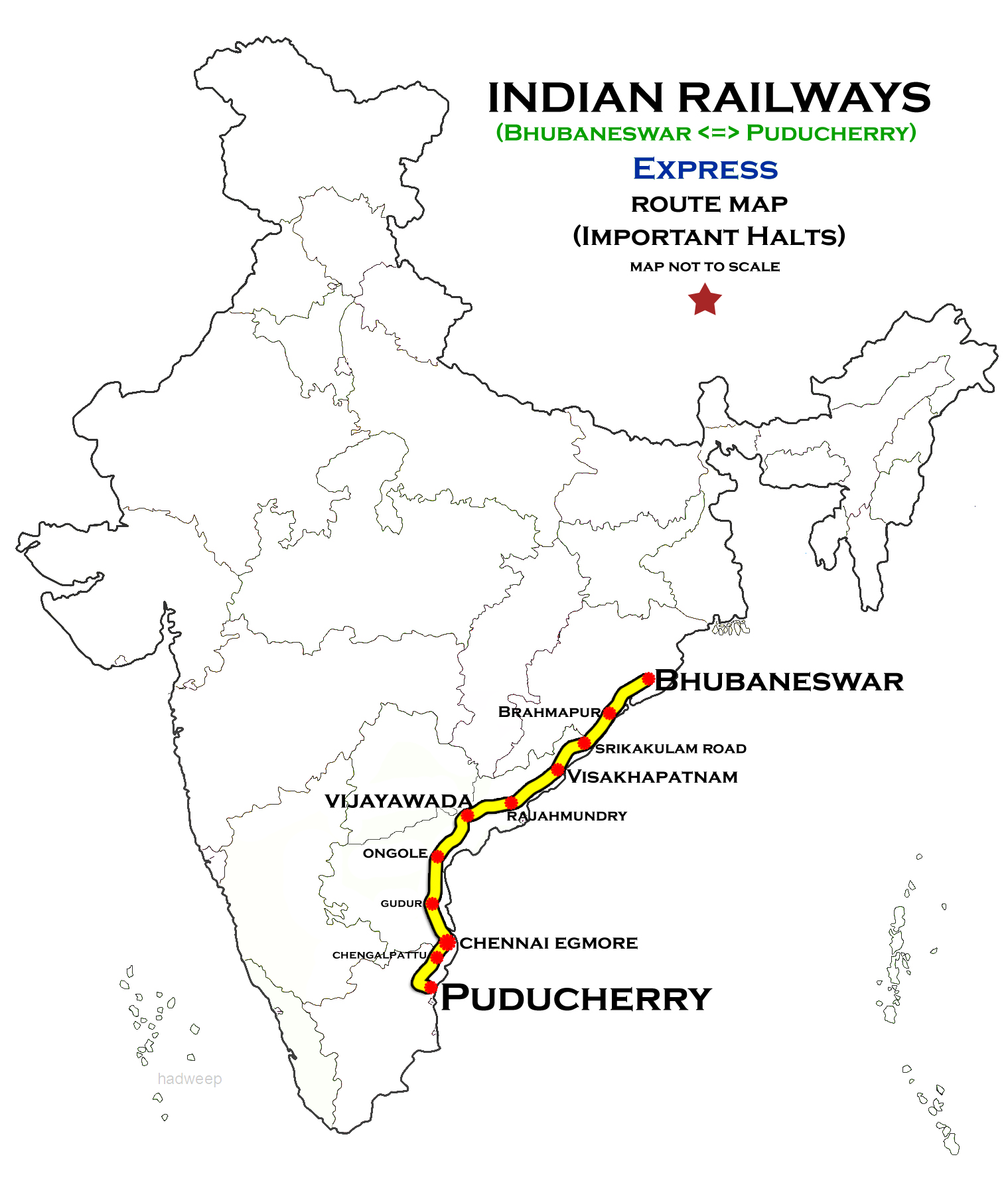

The Puducherry– Bhubaneswar Superfast Express is a Superfast train belonging to East Coast Railway zone that runs between Puducherry and Bhubaneswar in India. It is currently being operated with 22907/22908 train numbers on a weekly basis.

== Service ==
The 12897/Puducherry–Bhubaneswar SF Express has an average speed of 59 km/h and covers 1426 km in 24h. The 12898/Bhubaneswar–Puducherry SF Express has an average speed of 57 km/h and covers 1426 km in 25h 15m.

== Schedule ==
Train number	Station code	Departure station	Departure time	Departure day	Arrival station	Arrival time	Arrival day
12897	PDY	Puducherry	6:40 PM	Wednesday	Bhubaneswar	6:55 PM	Thursday
12898	BBS	Bhubaneswar	12:00 Noon	Tuesday	Puducherry	1:15 PM	Wednesday

== Route and halts ==
The important halts of the train are:

- Puducherry
- Viluppuram Junction
- Chennai Egmore
- Ongole
- Vijayawada Junction
- Rajahmundry
- Visakhapatnam Junction
- Vizianagaram Junction
- Brahmapur
- Khurda Road Junction
- Bhubaneswar

== Coach composite ==
The train has LHB coach with max speed of 130 kmph. Being a Superfast train, its speed limit is 110 kmph The train consists of 22 coaches:

- 2 AC II Tier
- 7 AC III Tier
- 6 Sleeper coaches
- 1 Pantry car
- 2 General Unreserved
- 4 Generator Cars cum Guard Cars in both ends

== Traction ==
Both trains are hauled by a Visakhapatnam Electric Loco Shed-based WAP-7 electric locomotives from end to end in both directions.

== Rake sharing ==
The train shares its rake with 18495/18496 Rameswaram–Bhubaneswar Express.

== Direction reversal ==
Train reverses its direction 1 times:

- Visakhapatnam Junction

== See also ==
- Puducherry railway station
- Bhubaneswar railway station
- Rameswaram–Bhubaneswar Express
