= Pune–Bhubaneswar Express =

Pune Junction–Bhubaneswar Express
Overview
- Service type: Express
- Locale: Maharashtra, Karnataka, Telanagana, Andhra Pradesh & Odisha
- First service: 24 February 2011; 15 years ago
- Current operator: East Coast Railway zone

Route
- Termini: Pune Junction; Bhubaneswar
- Stops: 23
- Distance travelled: 1,704 km (1,059 mi)
- Average journey time: 30 hours 22 mins
- Service frequency: Weekly
- Train number: 22881 / 22882

On-board services
- Classes: AC 2 Tier, AC 3 Tier, Sleeper Class & General Unreserved
- Seating arrangements: Yes
- Sleeping arrangements: Yes
- Catering facilities: No pantry car attached

Technical
- Rolling stock: Standard Indian Railways coaches
- Track gauge: 1,676 mm (5 ft 6 in)
- Operating speed: 56.5 km/h (35 mph)
Route map
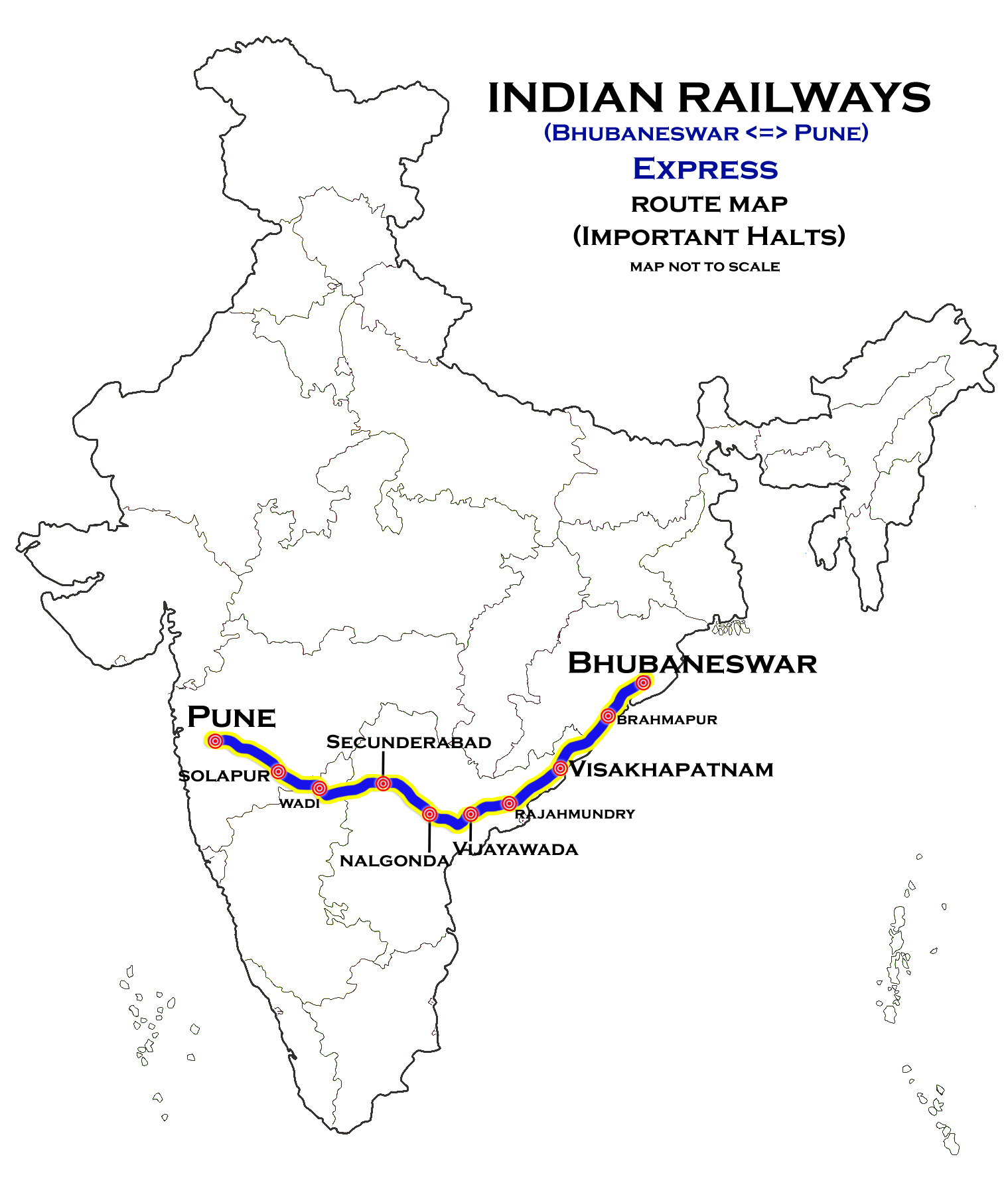

22881 / 82 Bhubaneswar–Pune–Bhubaneswar Express (Via. Guntur, Nalgonda) is an express Express train belonging to Indian Railways East Coast Railway Zone that runs between Pune Junction and Bhubaneswar in India. It commenced its operations on 24 February 2011, with Train Number 2582/2581.

== Service ==
It operates as train number 22881 from Pune Junction to Bhubaneswa} and as train number 22882 in the reverse direction, serving the states of Maharashtra, Karnataka, Telangana, Andhra Pradesh & Odisha. The train covers the distance of 1,704 km (1,059 mi) in 30 hours 22 mins approximately at a speed of 56.5 km/h (35.1 mph).

== Coaches ==
The 22881 / 82 Pune Junction–Bhubaneswar Express has two AC 2-tier, two AC 3-tier, ten sleeper class, four general unreserved & two SLR (seating with luggage rack) coaches. It doesn't carry a pantry car.

As with most train services in India, coach composition may be amended at the discretion of Indian Railways depending on demand.

== Routing ==
The 22881 / 82 Pune Junction Bhubaneswar Express runs from Pune Junction via Solapur, Gulbarga, Wadi Junction, Secunderabad Junction, Nalgonda,Guntur Junction, Vijayawada Junction, Duvvada, Visakhapatnam, Khurda Road Junction, to Bhubaneswar.

== Traction ==
As this route is going to be electrified, a Kazipet-based diesel WDM-3D loco pulls the train to Vijayawada Junction, later a Bhubaneswar-based WAP-4 electric locomotive pulls the train to its destination.
