= Digha–Visakhapatnam Express =

Overview
- Service type: Superfast
- First service: 24 February 2012; 14 years ago
- Current operator: South Coast Railway zone

Route
- Termini: Digha; Visakhapatnam
- Stops: 15
- Distance travelled: 926 km (575 mi)
- Average journey time: 15 hours 20 mins
- Service frequency: weekly
- Train number: 22873 / 22874

On-board services
- Classes: general unreserved, AC 2 Tier, AC 3 Tier, sleeper class
- Seating arrangements: Yes
- Sleeping arrangements: Yes
- Catering facilities: No

Technical
- Rolling stock: Standard Indian Railways Coaches
- Track gauge: 1,676 mm (5 ft 6 in)
- Operating speed: 61 km/h (38 mph)
Route map
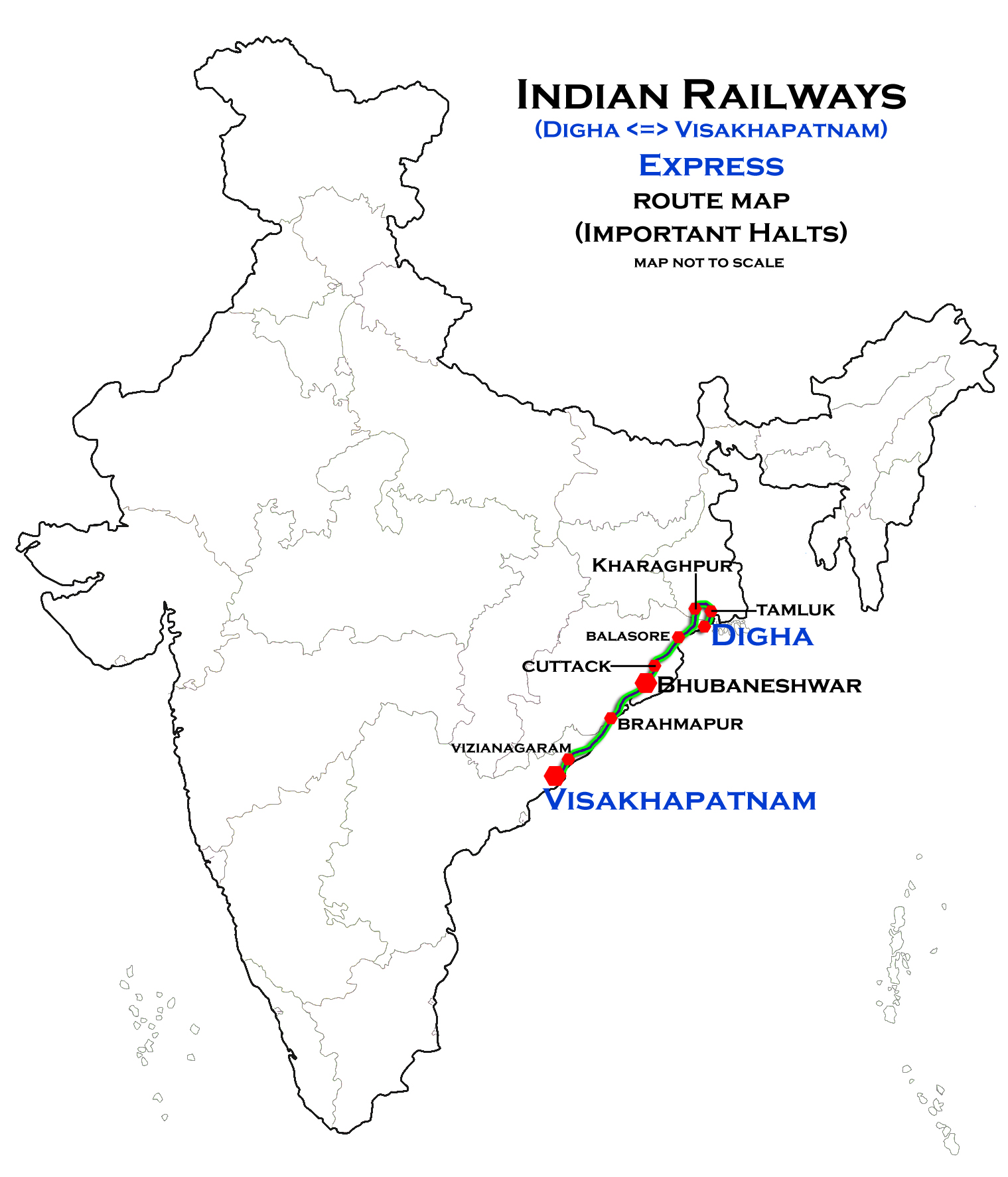

The 22873 / 74 Digha–Visakhapatnam Express is a Superfast train belonging to South Coast Railway zone that runs between Digha and Visakhapatnam in India.

It operates as train number 22873 from Digha to Visakhapatnam and as train number 22874 in the reverse direction, serving the states of West Bengal, Odisha and Andhra Pradesh.

== Coaches ==
The 22873 / 74 Digha–Visakhapatnam Express has one AC 2 tier, two AC 3 tier, eight sleeper coaches, six general unreserved and two SLR (seating with luggage rake) coaches . It does not carry a pantry car.

As is customary with most train services in India, coach composition may be amended at the discretion of Indian Railways depending on demand.

== Service ==
The 22873 Digha–Visakhapatnam Express covers the distance of 926 km (575 mi) in 15 hours 05 mins (62 km/h) and in 15 hours 35 mins as the 22874 Visakhapatnam–Digha Express (60 km/h).

As the average speed of the train is higher than 55 km/h (34 mph), as per railway rules, its fare includes a Superfast surcharge.

== Routing ==
The 22873 / 74 Digha–Visakhapatnam Express runs from Digha via Tamluk Junction, Kharagpur Junction, Khurda Road Junction, Vizianagaram Junction to Visakhapatnam.

== Traction ==
As the route is electrified, a Visakhapatnam-based WAP-7 electric locomotive pulls the train to its destination.
