= Jhadupudi =

- village
- Interactive map of Jhadupudi
- Location in Andhra Pradesh, India Jhadupudi (India)
- Coordinates: 19.0333°N 84.6167°E
- Country: India
- State: Andhra Pradesh
- District: Srikakulam
- Elevation: 42 m (138 ft)

Population (2001)
  - Total: 2,625

Languages
  - Official: Telugu
- Time zone: UTC+5:30 (IST)
- Nearest city: Visakhapatnam
- Lok Sabha constituency: Srikakulam
- Vidhan Sabha constituency: Ichchapuram

Jhadupudi is a small village in Kanchili mandal of Srikakulam District in Andhra Pradesh. It is located in between the small towns Sompeta and Ichchapuram.

== Geography ==
Jhadupudi is located at 19.0333°N 84.6167°E. It has an average elevation of 42 meters (141 feet).

== Demographics ==
As of 2001 census, the demographic details of Jadupudi village is as follows:

- Total Population: 2,625 in 617 Households
- Male Population: 1,180 and Female Population: 1,445
- Children Under 6-years of age: 440 (Boys - 218 and Girls - 222)
- Total Literates: 1,184

== Transport ==
Jhadupudi railway station is situated on Khurda Road–Visakhapatnam section, part of the Howrah-Chennai main line under Khurda Road railway division of East Coast Railway zone.also bus transport
