= Rameswaram–Bhubaneswar Express =

Train in India

Rameswaram−Bhubaneswar Express
Overview
- Service type: Superfast Express
- First service: 21 May 2011; 14 years ago
- Current operator: East Coast Railway

Route
- Termini: Rameswaram (RMM); Bhubaneswar (BBS)
- Stops: 39
- Distance travelled: 1,896 km (1,178 mi)
- Average journey time: 35 hours approx.
- Service frequency: Weekly
- Train number: 20849 / 20850

On-board services
- Classes: AC 2 Tier, AC 3 Tier, Sleeper Class, General Unreserved
- Seating arrangements: Yes
- Sleeping arrangements: Yes
- Catering facilities: Available
- Observation facilities: Large windows
- Baggage facilities: No
- Other facilities: Below the seats

Technical
- Rolling stock: LHB coach
- Track gauge: 1,676 mm (5 ft 6 in)
- Operating speed: 57 km/h (35 mph) average including halts.
Route map
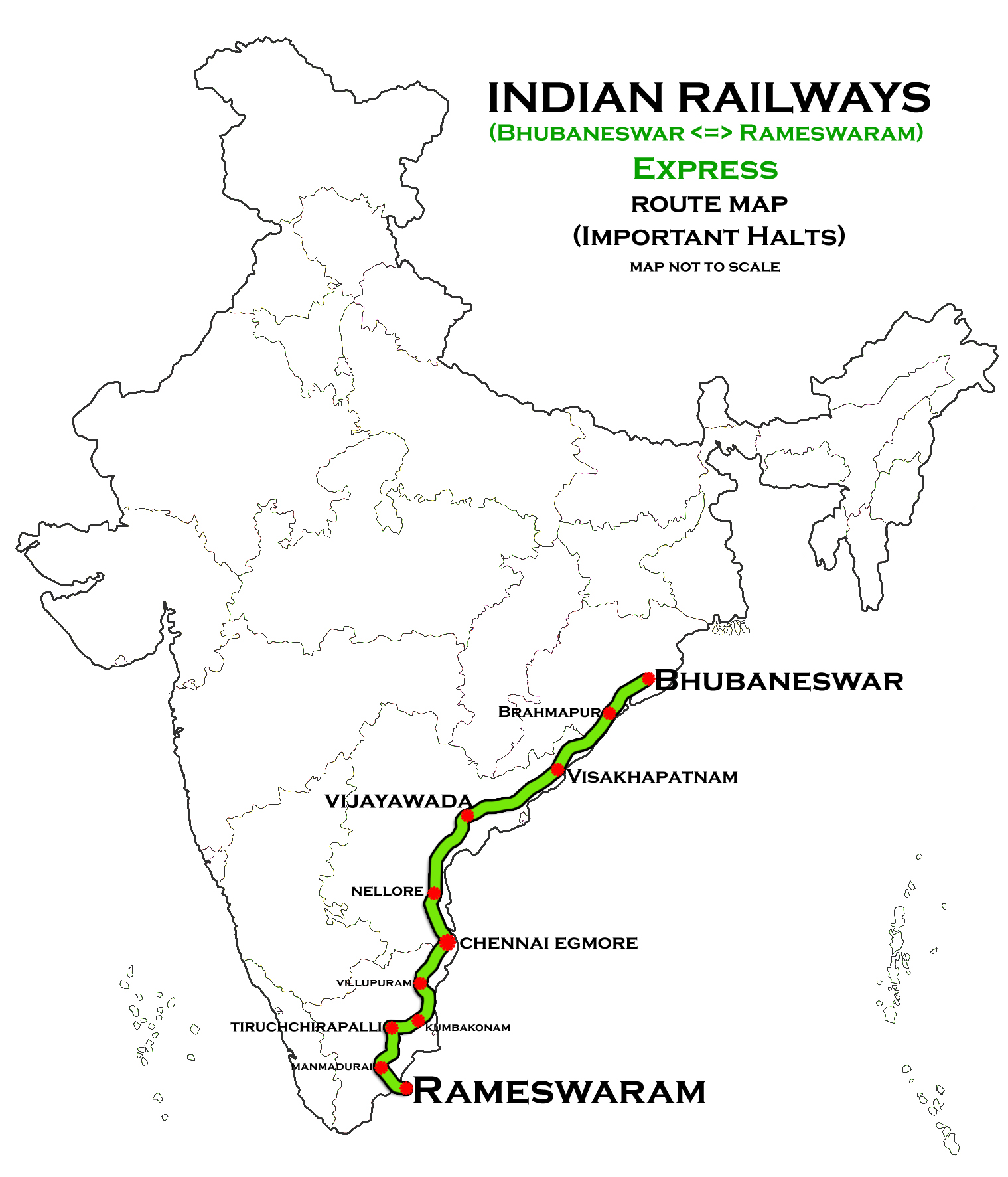

The 20849 / 20850 Rameswaram–Bhubaneswar Express is a superfast express train belonging to Indian Railways – East Coast Railway zone that runs between Rameswaram and Bhubaneswar in India.

It operates as train number 18495 from Rameswaram to Bhubaneswar and as train number 18496 in the reverse direction serving the states of Tamil Nadu, Andhra Pradesh & Odisha.

== Coaches ==
The 20850/49 Rameswaram–Bhubaneswar Express has one AC 2 tier, Four AC 3 tier, 11 Sleeper Class, 4 General Unreserved & 2 EOG Coaches. It carries a pantry car.

As is customary with most train services in India, coach composition may be amended at the discretion of Indian Railways depending on demand.

== Service ==
The 20850 Rameswaram–Bhubaneswar Express covers the distance of 1,896 km (1,178 mi) in 35 hours 00 mins (55 km/h) and in 35 hours 40 mins as 18496 Bhubaneswar–Rameswaram Express (54 km/h).

As the average speed of the train is lower than 55 km/h (34 mph), as per Indian Railways rules, its fare includes an express surcharge.

== Schedule ==
| Train number | Station code | Departure station | Departure time | Departure day | Arrival station | Arrival time | Arrival day |
|---|---|---|---|---|---|---|---|
| 20850 | RMM | Rameswaram | 8:50 | Sunday | Bhubaneswar | 18:10 | Monday |
| 20849 | BBS | Bhubaneswar | 12:10 | Friday | Rameswaram | 22:30 | Saturday |

== Routeing ==
The 20850/49 Rameswaram–Bhubaneswar Express runs from Rameswaram via,Manamadurai Junction, Sivaganga, Devakottai Road, Karaikkudi Junction, Tiruchirappalli Junction, Thanjavur Junction, Kumbakonam,Viluppuram Junction, Chennai Egmore, Vijayawada Junction, Visakhapatnam, Vizianagaram, Brahmapur.

== Traction ==
As the route is fully electrified, a Visakhapatnam Loco Shed based WAP-7 electric locomotive on its entire journey.

The train gets reversed in Visakhapatnam in both the directions.
