= Howrah–Puducherry Express =

Train in India

Howrah–Puducherry Superfast Express
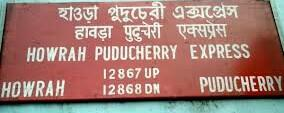

Overview
- Service type: Superfast Express
- First service: 8 April 2010; 16 years ago
- Current operator: South Eastern Railway zone

Route
- Termini: Howrah Junction; Puducherry
- Stops: 16
- Distance travelled: 1,917 km (1,191 mi)
- Average journey time: 33 hours 20 mins
- Service frequency: Weekly
- Train number: 12867 / 12868

On-board services
- Classes: AC 2 tier, AC 3 tier, AC 3 Economy, Sleeper class, General unreserved
- Seating arrangements: Yes
- Sleeping arrangements: Yes
- Catering facilities: Yes

Technical
- Rolling stock: Standard Indian Railways Coaches
- Track gauge: 1,676 mm (5 ft 6 in)
- Operating speed: 57 km/h (35 mph)
Route map
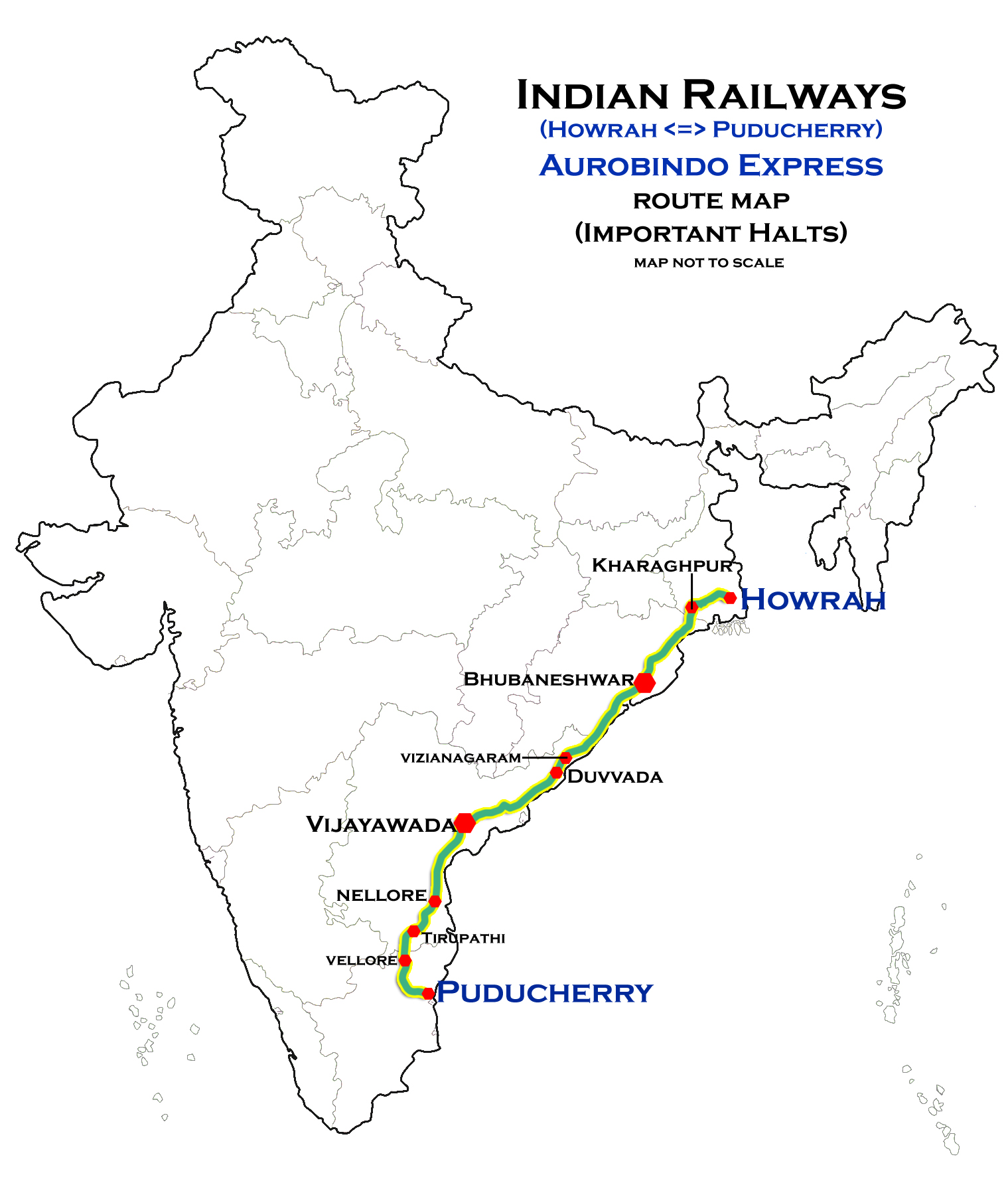

The 12867 / 68 Howrah–Puducherry Superfast Express is a Superfast Express train belonging to Indian Railways South Eastern Railway zone that runs between Howrah Junction and Puducherry in India.

It operates as train number 12867 from Howrah Junction to Puducherry and as train number 12868 in the reverse direction, serving the states of West Bengal, Odisha, Andhra Pradesh and Tamil Nadu.

== Coaches ==
The 12867 / 68 Howrah–Puducherry Express has one AC 2-tier, six AC 3-tier, 11 sleeper class, two general unreserved and two SLR (seating with luggage rake) coaches. It carries a pantry car.

As is customary with most train services in India, coach composition may be amended at the discretion of Indian Railways depending on demand.

== Service ==
The 12867 Howrah Junction–Puducherry Express covers the distance of 1,917 km (1,191 mi) in 33 hours 10 mins (58 km/h) and in 33 hours 30 mins as the 12868 Puducherry–Howrah Junction Express (56 km/h).

As the average speed of the train is above 55 km/h (34 mph), as per railway rules, its fare includes a Superfast surcharge.

== Routing ==
The 12867 / 68 Howrah–Puducherry Express runs from Howrah Junction via Kharagpur Junction, Khurda Road Junction, Visakhapatnam, Vijayawada Junction, Tirupati, Katpadi Junction, Tiruvannamalai, Viluppuram Junction to Puducherry.

== Traction ==
As the route is going to electrification, a Howrah-based WAP-4 electric loco pulls the train up to Visakhapatnam, then a Erode Junction or Lallaguda-based WAP-4 electric loco takes reverse direction and pulls the train to its destination.

== Schedule ==
12867 leaves Howrah every Sunday at night 11:20 PM IST and reaches Puducherry (Pondicherry) Tuesday at morning 8:30 AM

12868 leaves Puducherry (Pondicherry) every Wednesday at afternoon 2:15 PM IST and reaches Howrah on Thursday at 11:45 PM IST

== Reverse ==
The train is reversed at Visakhapatnam railway station.
