= Bhubaneswar–Chennai Central Express =

Train in India

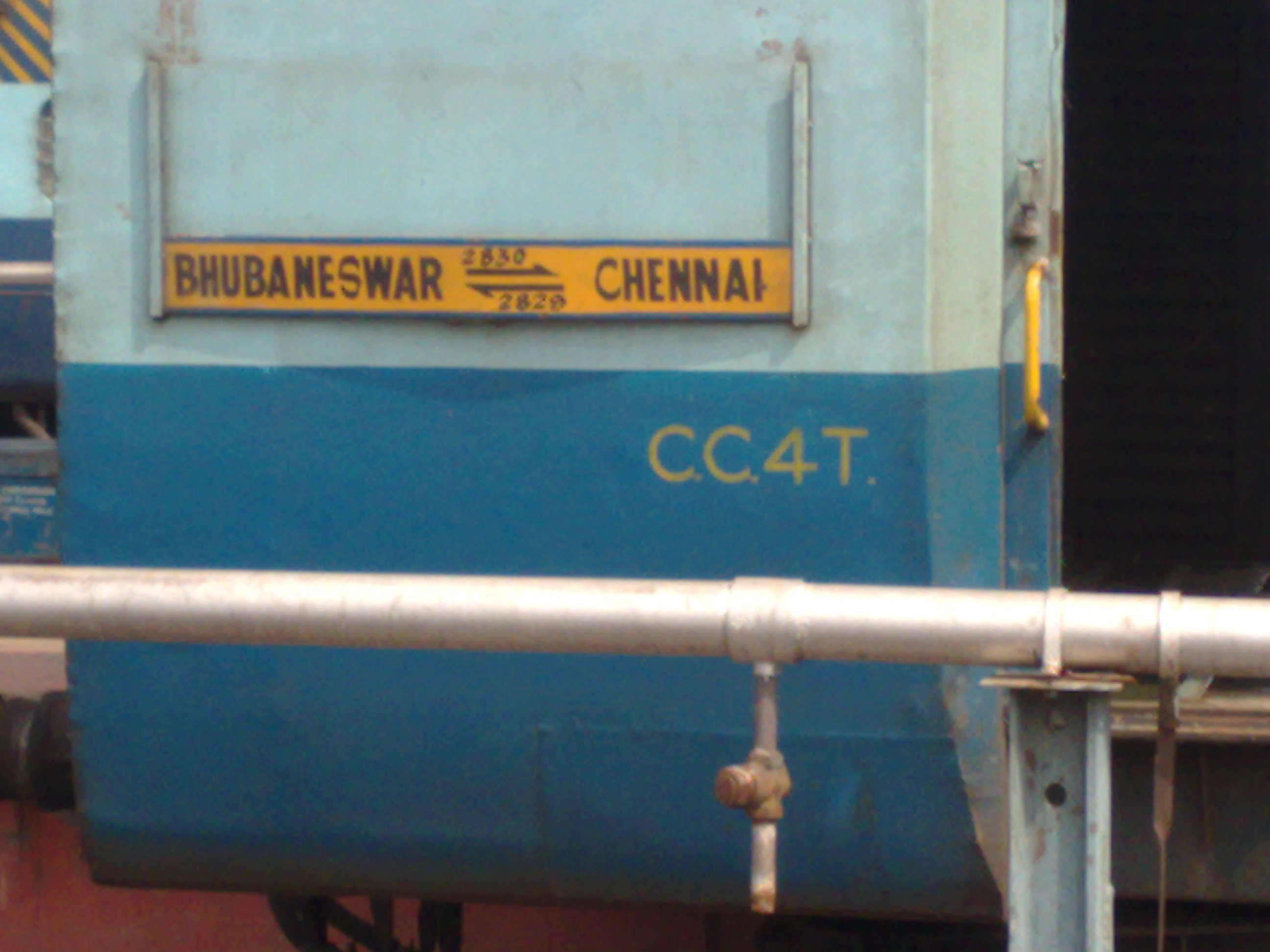

Overview
- Service type: Superfast
- First service: 17 March 2006 initially from Visakhapatnam as (6003/04 & 2659/2660) VSKP MAS EXP
- Current operator: East Coast Railways

Route
- Termini: Bhubaneswar; Chennai Central
- Stops: 19
- Distance travelled: 1,223 km (760 mi)
- Average journey time: 20 hours 25 minutes as 12829 Chennai Central–Bhubaneswar Express, 20 hours 55 minutes as 12830 Bhubaneswar–Chennai Central Express
- Service frequency: One day a week. 12830 Bhubaneswar–Chennai Central Express–Thursday. 12829 Chennai Central–Bhubaneswar Express – Friday.
- Train number: 12829 / 12830

On-board services
- Classes: AC 2 tier, AC 3 tier, Sleeper class, second class seating
- Seating arrangements: Yes
- Sleeping arrangements: Yes
- Catering facilities: Pantry car attached

Technical
- Rolling stock: Standard Indian Railways coaches
- Track gauge: 1,676 mm (5 ft 6 in)
- Operating speed: 110 km/h (68 mph) maximum, 59.18 km/h (37 mph), including halts
Route map
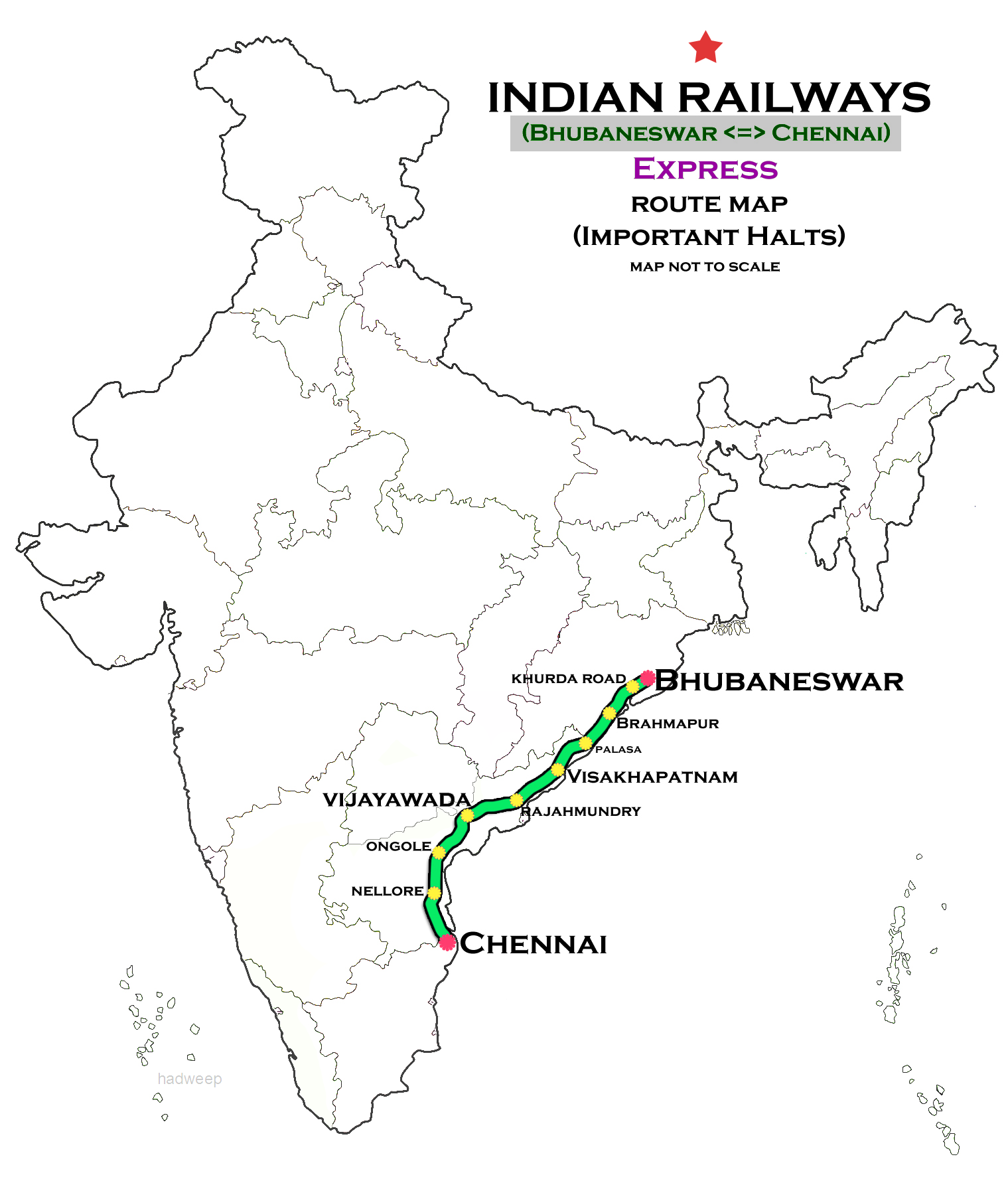

The 12830 / 29 Bhubaneswar–Chennai Central Express is a Superfast Express train belonging to Indian Railways – East Coast Railway zone that runs between Bhubaneswar and Chennai Central in India. Initially it was running between Visakhapatnam to Chennai later snatched by East Coast Railway to Bhubaneswar by extending it. It recently runs with modern LHB coaches.

It operates as train number 12829 from Chennai Central to Bhubaneswar and as train number 12830 in the reverse direction, serving the states of Odisha, Andhra Pradesh & Tamil Nadu.

== Coaches ==
The 12830 / 29 Bhubaneswar–Chennai Central Express presently has 1 AC 2 tier, 4 AC 3 tier, 11 Sleeper class, 4 Second Class seating & 2 EOG coaches. In addition, it carries a pantry car.

As with most train services in India, coach composition may be amended at the discretion of Indian Railways depending on demand.

== Service ==
The 12829 Chennai Central–Bhubaneswar Express covers the distance of 1223 kilometres in 20 hours 25 mins (59.90 km/h) and in 20 hrs 55 mins as 12830 Bhubaneswar–Chennai Central Express (58.47 km/h).

As the average speed of the train is above 55 km/h, as per Indian Railways rules, its fare includes a Superfast surcharge.

== Routeing ==
The 12830 / 29 Bhubaneswar–Chennai Central Express runs via Khurda Road Junction, Vizianagaram Junction, Visakhapatnam Junction, Vijayawada Junction to Chennai Central.

It reverses direction of travel at Visakhapatnam Junction.

== Traction ==
As the route is fully electrified, it is hauled end to end by an Arakkonam-based WAM-4 locomotive.

== Timings ==
12830 Bhubaneswar–Chennai Central Express leaves Bhubaneswar every Thursday at 12:00 hrs IST and reaches Chennai Central at 08:55 hrs IST the next day.

12829 Chennai Central–Bhubaneswar Express leaves Chennai Central every Friday at 21:10 hrs IST and reaches Bhubaneswar at 17:35 hrs IST the next day.
