= Lingaraj Temple Road railway station =

Railway station in Odisha, India

Lingaraj Temple Road

General information
- Location: Ekamra Marg, Palashpalli, Bhubaneswar, Odisha; India
- Coordinates: 20°14′06″N 85°48′57″E
- Elevation: 39 m (128 ft)
- System: Indian Railways station
- Owner: Indian Railways
- Operator: East Coast Railway
- Platforms: 3
- Tracks: 3

Construction
- Structure type: Standard on ground
- Parking: Yes
- Cycle facilities: Yes

Other information
- Status: Functioning
- Station code: LGTR
- Division(s): Khurda Road

History
- Opened: 1896
Location
- Location within Odisha Location within India

Lingaraj Temple Road is a station located in Bhubaneswar.

== The railway station ==
Lingaraj Temple Road railway station is located at an altitude of 39 m (128 ft). It has been allotted the code LGTR and functions within the jurisdiction of Khurda Road railway division.

== History ==
During the period 1893 to 1896, 1,287 km (800 mi) of the East Coast State Railway, from Vijayawada to Cuttack was built and opened to traffic, and construction of the Vijayawada–Chennai link in 1899 enabled the through running of trains along the eastern coast of India. Bengal Nagpur Railway was working on both the Howrah–Kharagpur and Kharagpur–Cuttack lines, completed the bridge over the Rupnarayan in 1900 and the Mahanadi in 1901, thus completing the through connection between Chennai and Kolkata.

== Electrification ==
Bhubaneswar Yard and Khurda Road-Bhubaneswar section was electrified in 2001–02. Bhubaneswar-Barang section was electrified in 2002–03.

Preceding station	Indian Railways	Following station
Bhubaneswar towards Howrah Junction	East Coast Railway zone Howrah–Chennai main line	Sarkantra towards Chennai Central
