= Nayudupeta railway station =

Railway station in Andhra Pradesh, India

Nayadupeta

General information
- Location: Naidupeta, Tirupati district, Andhra Pradesh; India
- Coordinates: 13.9082°N 79.9012°E
- Elevation: 33 m (108 ft)
- System: Indian Railways station
- Lines: Vijayawada–Chennai section of Howrah–Chennai main line and Delhi–Chennai line
- Platforms: 3
- Tracks: 5 ft 6 in (1,676 mm) broad gauge

Construction
- Structure type: Standard (on-ground station)
- Parking: Available

Other information
- Status: Functioning
- Station code: NYP
- Zone(s): Southern Railway,
- Division(s): Chennai

History
- Opened: 1899
- Electrified: 1980–81
Location
- Location within India Location within Andhra Pradesh

Nayadupeta railway station (station code: NYP) is an NSG–5 category Indian railway station in Chennai railway division of Southern Railway zone. It is located in the Indian state of Andhra Pradesh, serves Naidupeta in Tirupati district.

== History ==
The Vijayawada–Chennai link was established in 1899.

The Chirala–Elavur section was electrified in 1980–81.

== Station ==
Nayadupeta station has three platforms. Daily, thirty trains pass through this station.

== Amenities ==
Nayadupeta station has computerised reservation facilities (with all-India linkage), waiting room, retiring room, light refreshment facilities and book stall.
