= Howrah–Sathya Sai Prasanthi Nilayam Express =

Howrah Junction–Sri Sathya Sai Prasanthi Nilayam Express
Overview
- Service type: Superfast
- First service: 19 February 2011; 15 years ago
- Current operator: South Eastern Railway zone

Route
- Termini: Howrah Junction; Sathya Sai Prasanthi Nilayam
- Stops: 17
- Distance travelled: 1,760 km (1,094 mi)
- Average journey time: 31 hours
- Service frequency: Weekly
- Train number: 22831 / 22832

On-board services
- Classes: AC 2 tier, AC 3 tier, sleeper class, general unreserved
- Seating arrangements: Yes
- Sleeping arrangements: Yes
- Catering facilities: No

Technical
- Rolling stock: Standard Indian Railways Coaches
- Operating speed: 56.5 km/h (35 mph)
Route map
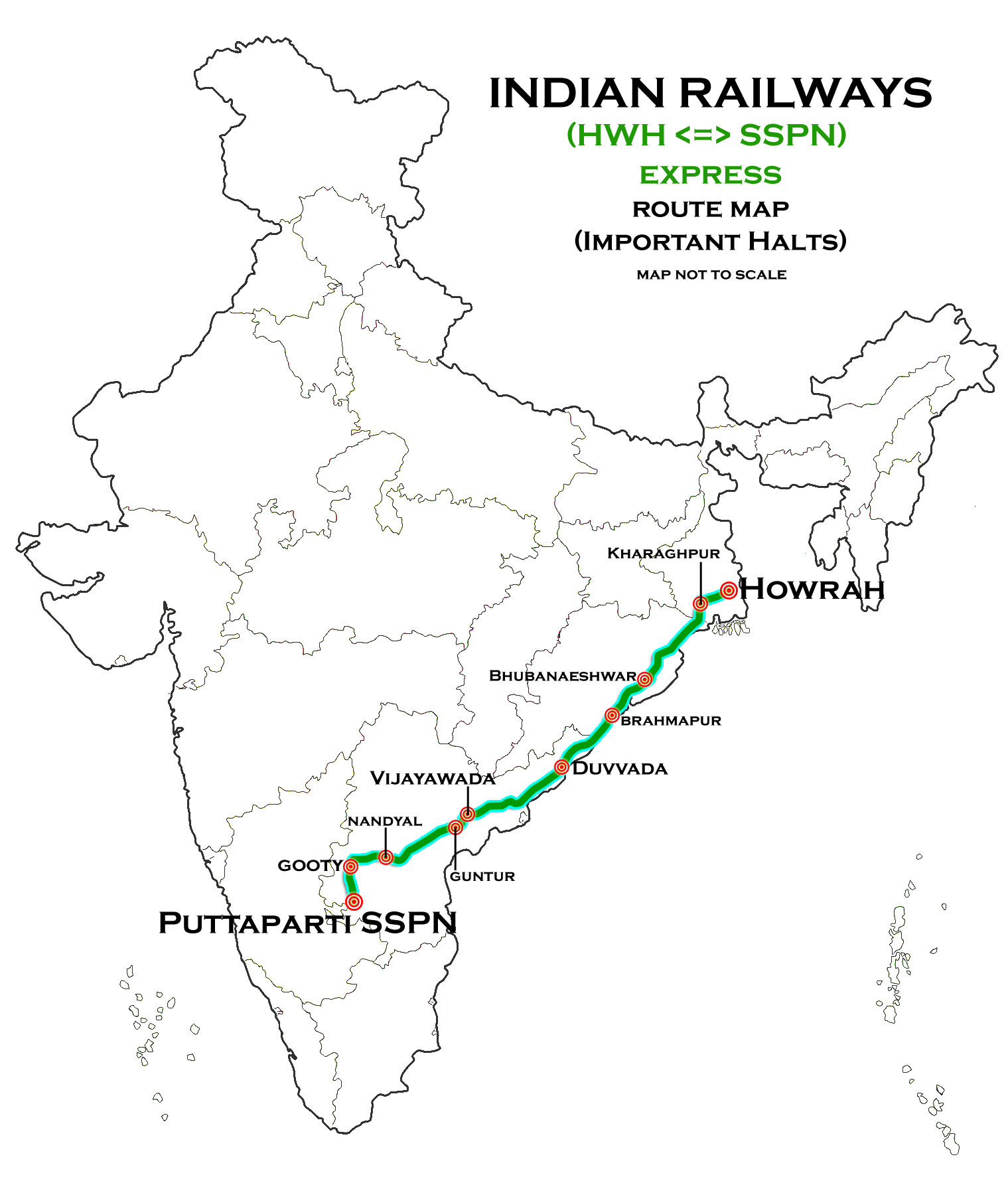

The 22831 / 32 Howrah Junction–Sri Sathya Sai Prasanthi Nilayam Express (HWH–SSPN) was a Superfast express train belonging to Indian Railways East Coast Zone that ran between Howrah Junction and Sathya Sai Prasanthi Nilayam in India. In August 2024, the route of this train was extended up to Yesvantpur Junction (YPR) in Bengaluru, Karnataka and is currently known as the 22831 / 32 Howrah Junction–Yesvantpur Junction Superfast Express.

This train was originally introduced to facilitate the travel of devotees of spiritual guru and philanthropist Sri Sathya Sai Baba to his ashram, Prasanthi Nilayam in Puttaparthi, Andhra Pradesh, India, and to patients seeking free yet advanced medical assistance at the hospitals set up by Sai Baba in Puttaparthi.

It operated as train number 22831 from Howrah Junction to Sathya Sai Prasanthi Nilayam and as train number 22832 in the reverse direction, serving the states of West Bengal, Odisha and Andhra Pradesh.

As of June 2025, other than the aspect of route extension, the rest of the configurations as mentioned in this Wikipedia article have been retained in the 22831 / 32 HWH–YPR SF Express.

== Coaches ==
The 22831 / 32 Howrah Junction–Sathya Sai Prasanthi Nilayam Express had one AC 2-tier, four AC 3-tier, nine sleeper class, six general unreserved and two SLR (seating with luggage rake) coaches. It did not carry a pantry car.

As is customary with most train services in India, coach composition could have been amended at the discretion of Indian Railways depending on demand.

== Service ==
The 22831 Howrah Junction–Sathya Sai Prasanthi Nilayam Express covered a distance of 1,760 km (1,094 mi) in 30 hours 50 mins (avg. 57 km/h) and in 31 hours 10 mins as the 22832 Sathya Sai Prasanthi Nilayam–Howrah Junction Express (avg. 56 km/h).

As the average speed of the train was above 31 km/h (19 mph), as per railway rules, its fare included a Superfast surcharge.

== Schedule ==
22832 – left Sri Sathya Sai Prasanthi Nilayam every Friday and reached Howrah Saturday at 2:50 PM IST

22831 – left Howrah every Wednesday at 3:35 PM and reached Sri Sathya Sai Prasanthi Nilayam on Thursday at 10:25 PM IST

== Routing ==
The 22831 / 32 Howrah Junction–Sathya Sai Prasanthi Nilayam Express ran from Howrah Junction via Kharagpur Junction, Khurda Road Junction, Duvvada, Vijayawada Junction, Guntur Junction, Nandyal, Gooty Junction, Anantapur, Dharmavaram Junction to Sri Sathya Sai Prasanthi Nilayam.

== Traction ==
As the route was completely electrified, a Santragachi Junction- or Vijayawada Junction- or Krishnarajapuram- based WAP-4 electric loco hauled the train up to its destination.

== Rake composition ==
- 1 AC II Tier
- 4 AC III Tier
- 9 Sleeper coaches
- 6 General
- 2 Second-class Luggage/parcel van
- 2 GRD

Loco	1	2	3	4	5	6	7	8	9	10	11	12	13	14	15	16	17	18	19	20	21	22		
	GRD	GEN	GEN	GEN	GEN	S1	S2	S3	S4	S5	S6	S7	S8	S9	B1	B2	B3	B4	A1	GEN	GEN	GRD	VP	VP
