= Vizianagaram Junction railway station =

Railway station in Andhra Pradesh, India

Vizianagaram Junction
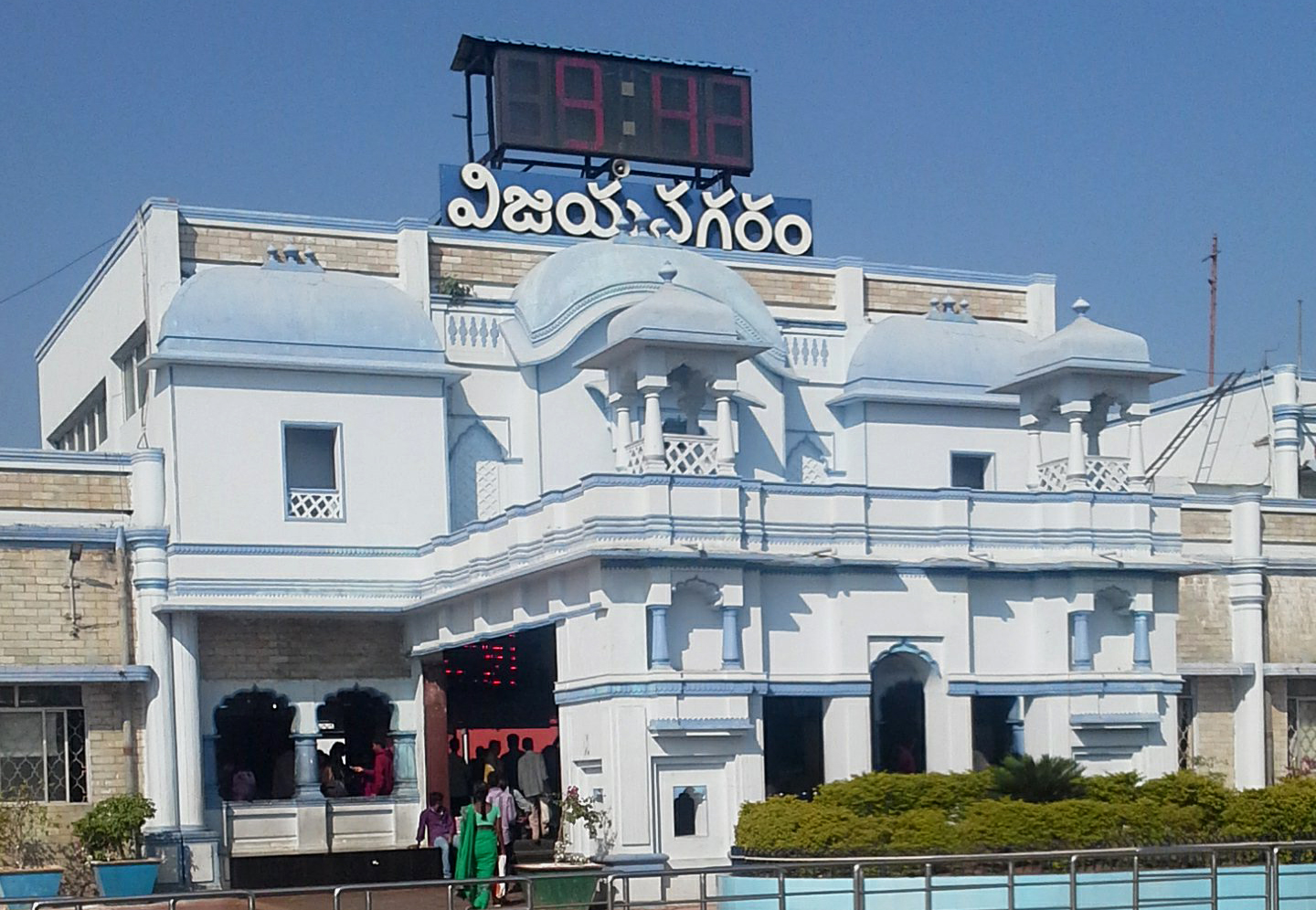
- Vizianagaram railway station

General information
- Location: Vizianagaram, Andhra Pradesh; India
- Coordinates: 18°06′43″N 83°23′46″E
- Elevation: 74 m (243 ft)
- System: Indian Railways junction station
- Owner: Indian Railways
- Operator: South coast railway
- Lines: Khurda Road–Visakhapatnam section of Howrah–Chennai main line and Jharsuguda–Vizianagaram line
- Platforms: 5
- Tracks: 9

Construction
- Structure type: Standard (on-ground station)
- Parking: Available

Other information
- Status: Functioning
- Station code: VZM
- Zone(s): South Coast Railway
- Division(s): Visakhapatnam

History
- Opened: 1900
- Former names: Bengal Nagpur Railway

Passengers
- 150,000+

Services
Preceding station	Indian Railways	Following station
Nellimarla towards Howrah Junction	South Coast Railway zone Howrah–Chennai main line	Korukonda towards Chennai Central
Terminus	South Coast Railway zone Vizianagaram–Raipur branch line	Gotlam towards ?
Location
- Location within Andhra Pradesh Location within India

Vizianagaram railway station (station code:VZM) is an Indian railway station located in the Indian state of Andhra Pradesh; it serves Vizianagaram city in Vizianagaram district. It is one of the important railway stations on Howrah–Chennai main line, serving as the point where links from Raipur and Jharsuguda via Titlagarh connect to the main line. It is administered under South Coast Railway zone.

== History ==
=== Main line ===
Between 1893 and 1896, 1,288 km (800 mi) of the South Eastern Railway was opened for traffic. In 1898–99, Bengal Nagpur Railway was linked to the lines in southern India. It was during this period that Vizianagaram station came up.

=== Branch line ===
The 79 km (49 mi) Vizianagaram–Parvatipuram line was opened in 1908–09.

== Electrification ==
The Palasa–Tilaru, Srikakulam Road–Chiprupalle and Chirupalle–Alamanda sectors were electrified in 1998–99. The Srikakulam Road–Tilaru sector was electrified in 1999–2000.

== Classification ==
Vizianagaram Junction railway station is classified as an A–category station in the Waltair railway division.

== Railway reorganization ==
The Bengal Nagpur Railway was nationalized in 1944.Eastern Railway was formed on 14 April 1952 with the portion of East Indian Railway Company east of Mughalsarai and the Bengal Nagpur Railway. In 1955, South Eastern Railway was carved out of Eastern Railway. It comprised lines mostly operated by BNR earlier. Amongst the new zones started in April 2003 were East Coast Railway and South East Central Railway. Both these railways were carved out of South Eastern Railway. South Coast Railway was carved out of East Coast Railway and South Central Railway on 27 Feb 2019.
