= Visakhapatnam railway station =

Railway station at Visakhapatnam in Andhra Pradesh

Visakhapatnam Junction
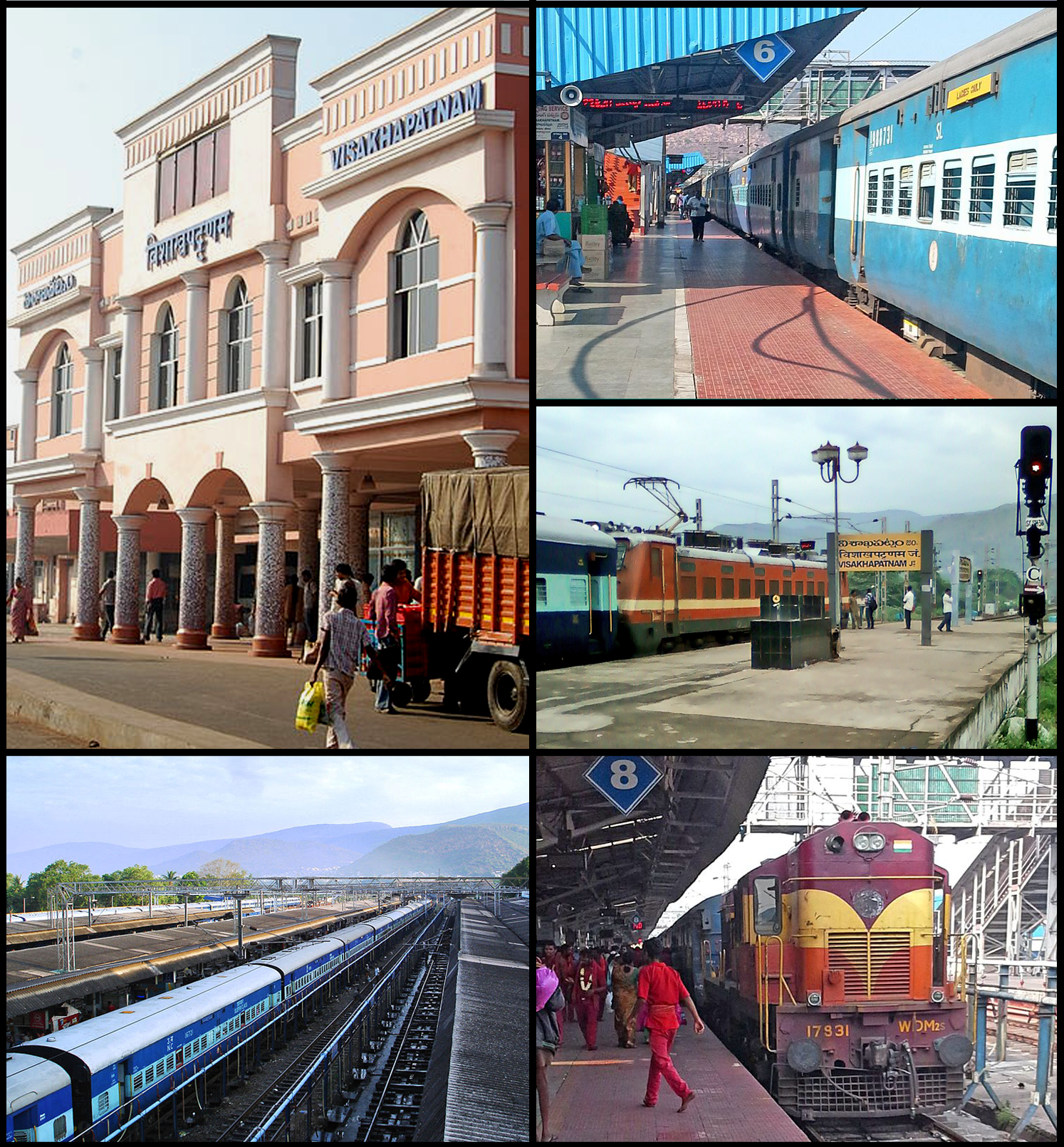
- 1)Visakhapatnam railway station in 2021 (day); 2)Visakhapatnam railway station in 2011; 3) Visakhapatnam railway station in 2021 (night)

General information
- Location: Gnanapuram, Railway New Colony, Visakhapatnam, Andhra Pradesh-530004; India
- Coordinates: 17°43′20″N 83°17′23″E
- Elevation: 5.970 metres (19.59 ft)
- System: Regional rail, Light rail & Goods railway station
- Owner: Indian Railways
- Lines: Howrah–Chennai main line, Visakhapatnam–Kirandul line, Khurda Road–Visakhapatnam section, Howrah–Chennai main line
- Platforms: 8 (+ 6 more under construction)
- Tracks: 10 (+ 6 more under construction)

Construction
- Structure type: Standard on-ground
- Parking: Available
- Accessible: Available

Other information
- Status: Active
- Station code: VSKP
- Zone(s): South Coast Railway zone
- Division(s): Visakhapatnam

History
- Opened: 7th October 1896 (128 years ago)
- Rebuilt: 2017
- Former names: Waltair
Route map
Location
- Location within Visakhapatnam
- Interactive map

Visakhapatnam Junction railway station (station code: VSKP) is a railway station located in Visakhapatnam in the Indian state of Andhra Pradesh.categorized as a Non-Suburban Grade -1 station.Visakhapatnam Railway Station is a major revenue earner for Indian Railways. In the financial years 2021-22 to 2023-24, it is 17th in the list of 20 highest-earning stations in India, generating Rs. 564.31 crores.the railway station that generates the most revenue among all the railway stations in Andhra Pradesh.

It has eight platforms. As part of the Visakhapatnam Railway station redevelopment, six more platforms are being constructed The station will then have a total of 14 platforms with 250 trains passing by every day. It is the largest Railway Station in Andhra Pradesh. It is on the Howrah–Chennai main line and is being operated by South coast Railway.

Visakhapatnam is also the headquarters of South Coast Railway. Originally named the Waltair railway station, it was founded in 1896. It was renamed as Visakhapatnam junction in 1987.

== History ==
From 1893 to 1896, 1,287 km (800 mi) of track, covering the coast from Cuttack to Vijayawada, were built by Bengal Nagpur Railway (later South Eastern Railway). The station was founded as Waltair railway station in 1896, and Bengal Nagpur Railway's line to Cuttack was opened on 1 January 1899. In 1902, the company took over the 514 km (319 mi)-long northern portion of the East Coast line to Cuttack, including the branch line to Puri. The southern part was subsequently merged with Madras and Southern Mahratta Railway.

== Routes ==
Visakhapatnam has been a busy station since it was part of the East Coast Railway zone to today. Platforms are not always available for incoming trains, and the average train's halt period is at least 20 minutes.

If a train is late, trains after it are stopped at Duvvada or Vizianagaram. The Route Relay Interlocking (RRI) system is an arrangement of signal apparatus, preventing conflicting movements through an arrangement of tracks such as junctions or crossings. It is a cause for trains being delayed after they pass through Duvvada.

Over 5,000 people per day travel between Visakhapatnam and Secunderabad, which are connected by over 18 trains, including the newly inaugurated Visakhapatnam - Secunderabad Vande Bharat Express. Another route, the Hyderabad–Visakhapatnam Godavari Express of the South Central Railway, passes into Visakhapatnam.

== Infrastructure ==
Visakhapatnam station's area is 103,178 m^{2} (1,110,600 sq ft). There are eight platforms, most of which are the same size, and all of the tracks are broad-gauge and electrified.

The station features escalators and a bus station. A majority of platforms are wheelchair-friendly and accessible via ramp.

Over 200 employees work in the station.

=== Amenities ===
There are Wi-Fi facilities and a 'fun zone' for children. The east and west terminals are equipped with reservation counters.

=== Sheds ===
The Diesel Loco Shed at Visakhapatnam is the largest of Indian Railways, with a capacity to accommodate 300 diesel locomotives. The Electric Loco Shed can accommodate 297 locomotives.

== Environmental work ==
Visakhapatnam has been named the cleanest railway station in the country by the Quality Council of India and earned a platinum rating for being environmentally friendly from the Indian Green Building Council (IGBC).

== See also ==
- List of railway stations in India
- Chennai Central railway station

Preceding station	Indian Railways	Following station
Marripalem towards ?	South Coast Railway zone Visakhapatnam–Vijayawada section of Howrah–Chennai main line	Terminus
