= Visakha Express =

Train in India

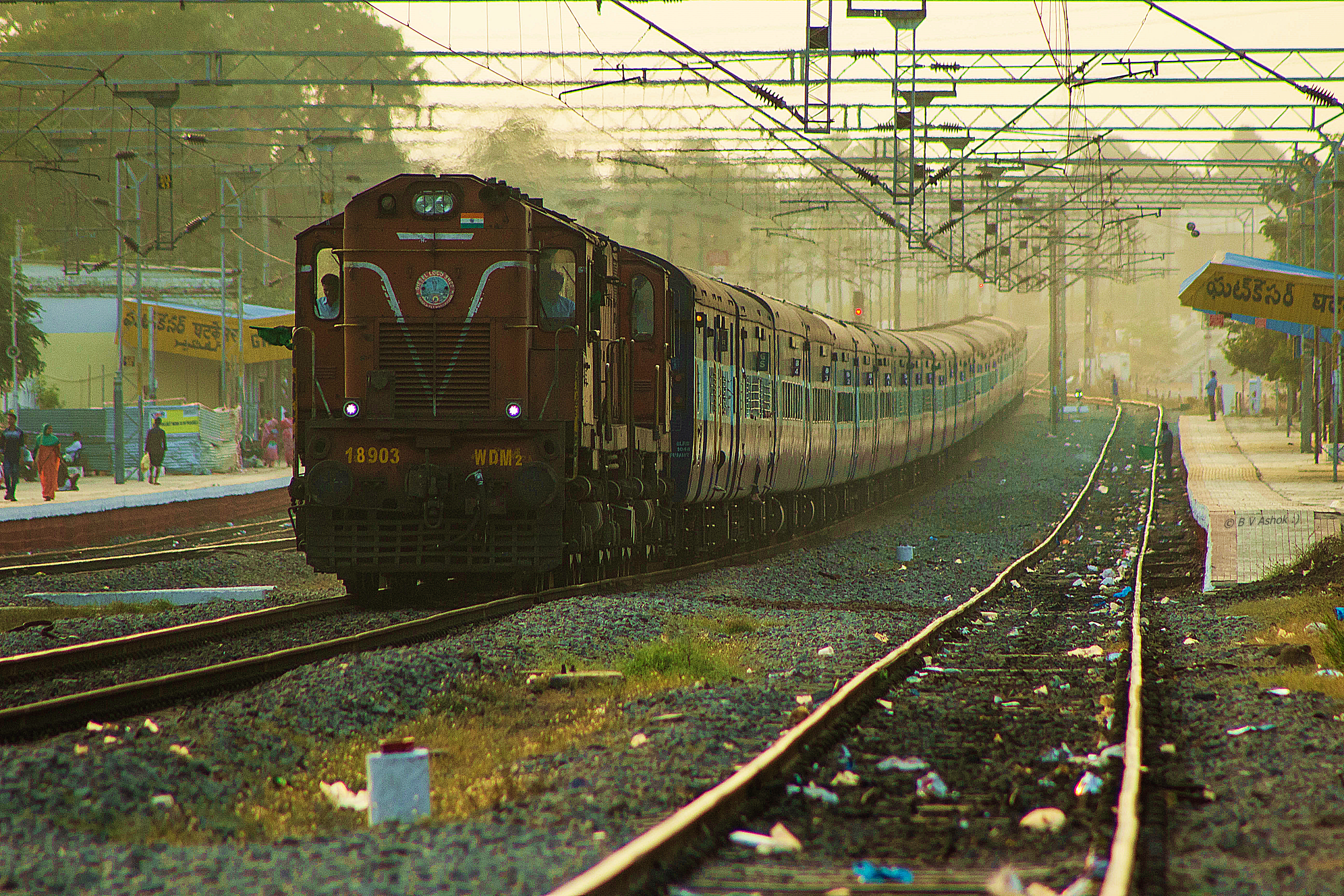
- Visakha Express passing through Ghatkesar spotted in 2017

Overview
- Service type: Express
- First service: 1994; 32 years ago
- Current operator: South Central Railway

Route
- Termini: Secunderabad (SC); Bhubaneswar (BBS)
- Stops: 38
- Distance travelled: 1,134 km (705 mi)
- Average journey time: 22 hours 50 minutes
- Service frequency: Daily
- Train number: 17015 / 17016

On-board services
- Classes: AC First Class, AC 2 Tier, AC 3 Tier, Sleeper Class, General Unreserved
- Seating arrangements: Yes
- Sleeping arrangements: Yes
- Catering facilities: On-board catering, E-catering
- Observation facilities: Large windows
- Baggage facilities: Available
- Other facilities: Below the seats

Technical
- Rolling stock: LHB coach
- Track gauge: 1,676 mm (5 ft 6 in) Broad Gauge
- Operating speed: 50 km/h (31 mph) average including halts.

The 17015 / 17016 Visakha Express is a daily express train owned by Indian Railways connecting Secunderabad (SC) to Bhubaneswar New (BBSN). It was widely popularised by the 2008 Telugu movie of the same name. The train's numbers are 17015 and 17016.

It is part of the South Central Railway zone. Train number 17016 leaves Secunderabad Junction at 16:50 hr and arrives at Bhubaneswar New the next day at 16:25 hr. Train number 17015 leaves Bhubaneswar New at 08:40 AM and arrives at Secunderabad Junction the next day at 07:45 AM.

== Route and halts ==
The train runs from Secunderabad via Nalgonda, Miryalaguda, Nadikudi, Piduguralla, Sattenapalle Guntur Junction, Vijayawada, Gudivada, Bhimavaram Town, Tanuku, Nidadavolu, Rajahmundry, Samalkot, Annavaram, Tuni, Elamanchili, Anakapalle, Duvvada, Visakhapatnam, Simhachalam, Kothavalasa, Vizianagaram, Ponduru, Srikakulam Road, Tilaru, Kotabommali, Naupada, Palasa, Sompeta, Ichchapuram, Brahmapur, Chhatrapur, Balugaon, Nirakarpur, Khurda Road to Bhubaneswar New.

== Composition ==
The rake consists of 1 First AC coach, II 2 tier coaches, 7 AC3 tier coaches, 6 sleeper coaches, 4 General sitting, 1 SLR and 1 EOG Car.

== Traction ==
The train is hauled by a Lallaguda Loco Shed or Vijayawada Loco Shed-based WAP-7 electric locomotive from Secunderabad to Visakhapatnam. From Visakhapatnam a Visakhapatnam Loco Shed-based WAP-7 electric locomotive powers the train till Bhubaneswar and vice versa.

== Direction reversal ==
The train reverses its direction once at;

- Visakhapatnam Junction.

== See also ==
- Secunderabad Vishakhapatnam Garib Rath Express
- Secunderabad Visakhapatnam Duronto Express

== Sources ==
- India-Rail-Info article on Visakha Express
