= Bhubaneswar New railway station =

Railway station in Odisha, India

Bhubaneswar New
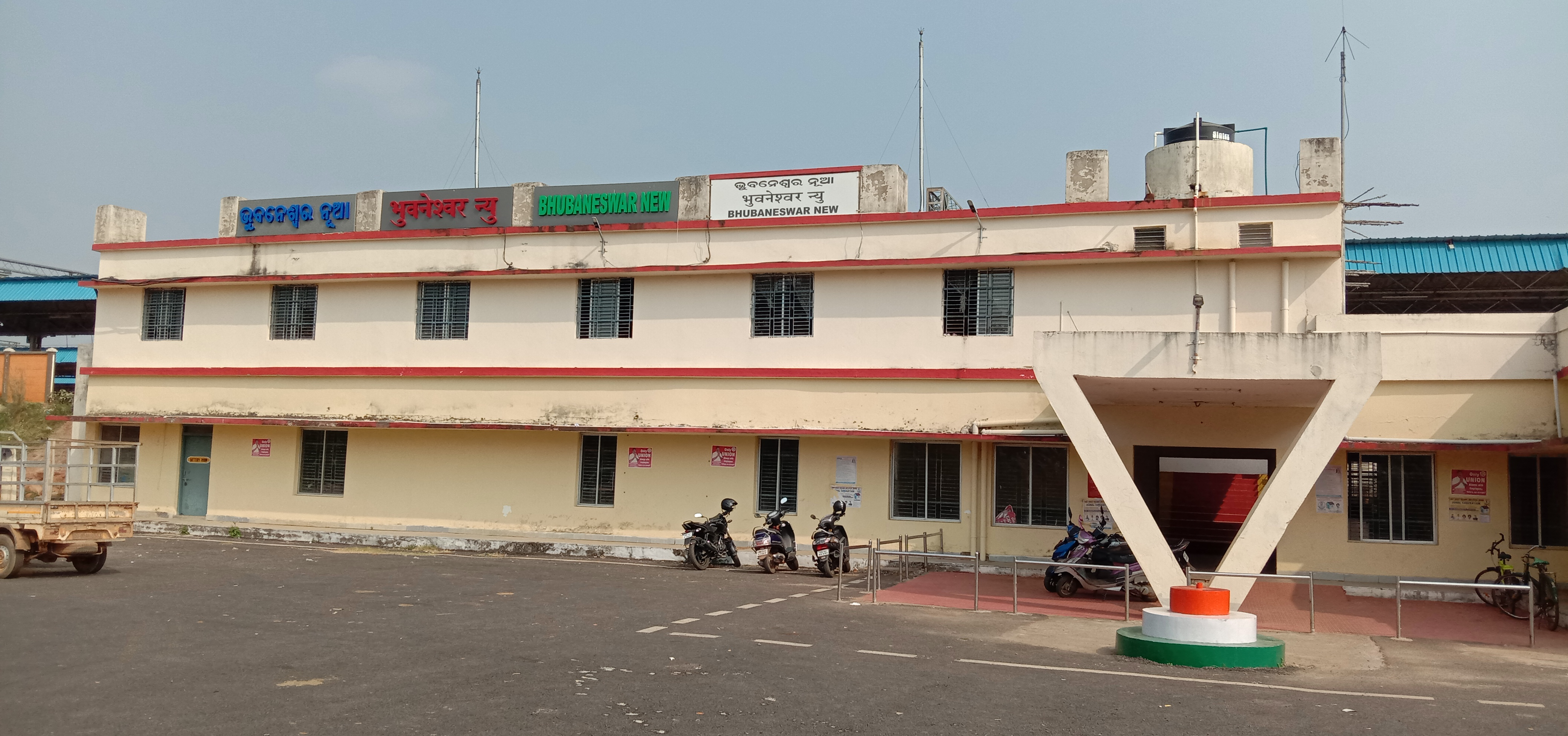

General information
- Location: Bhubaneswar, Odisha; India
- Coordinates: 20.3830°N 85.8356°E
- Elevation: 25 m (82 ft)
- System: Indian Railways station
- Owner: Indian Railways
- Operator: Khurda Road railway division
- Lines: Howrah–Chennai main line Kharagpur–Puri line
- Platforms: 7
- Tracks: 9
- Connections: Taxi stand, auto stand

Construction
- Structure type: Standard (on-ground station)
- Parking: Available
- Cycle facilities: Available
- Accessible: Disabled access

Other information
- Station code: BBSN
- Fare zone: East Coast Railways

History
- Opened: July 2018

Services
Preceding station	Indian Railways	Following station
Barang Junction towards Howrah Junction	East Coast Railway zone Howrah–Chennai main line	Patia towards Chennai Central
Location
- Location within Odisha Location within India

Bhubaneswar New railway station (BBSN) serves the northern part of the city of Bhubaneswar, the capital of the Indian state of Odisha. The station lies in the East Coast Railway zone of the Indian Railways. It has 7 platforms and 9 tracks. It was opened for public in July 2018. It is a satellite passenger terminal that is located on the northern side between Mancheswar railway station and Barang railway station as Bhubaneswar railway station is located on the southern side of the city.

Recently, the terminal of three trains which were earlier originating from Bhubaneswar have been shifted to Bhubaneswar New. These trains are Visakha Express, Konark Express and Bhubaneswar - Visakhapatnam Intercity Express. Also, a new express train to Boudh railway station has been inaugurated.
