= Chandni Chowk, Cuttack =

Place in Cuttack, Odisha

Chandni Chowk
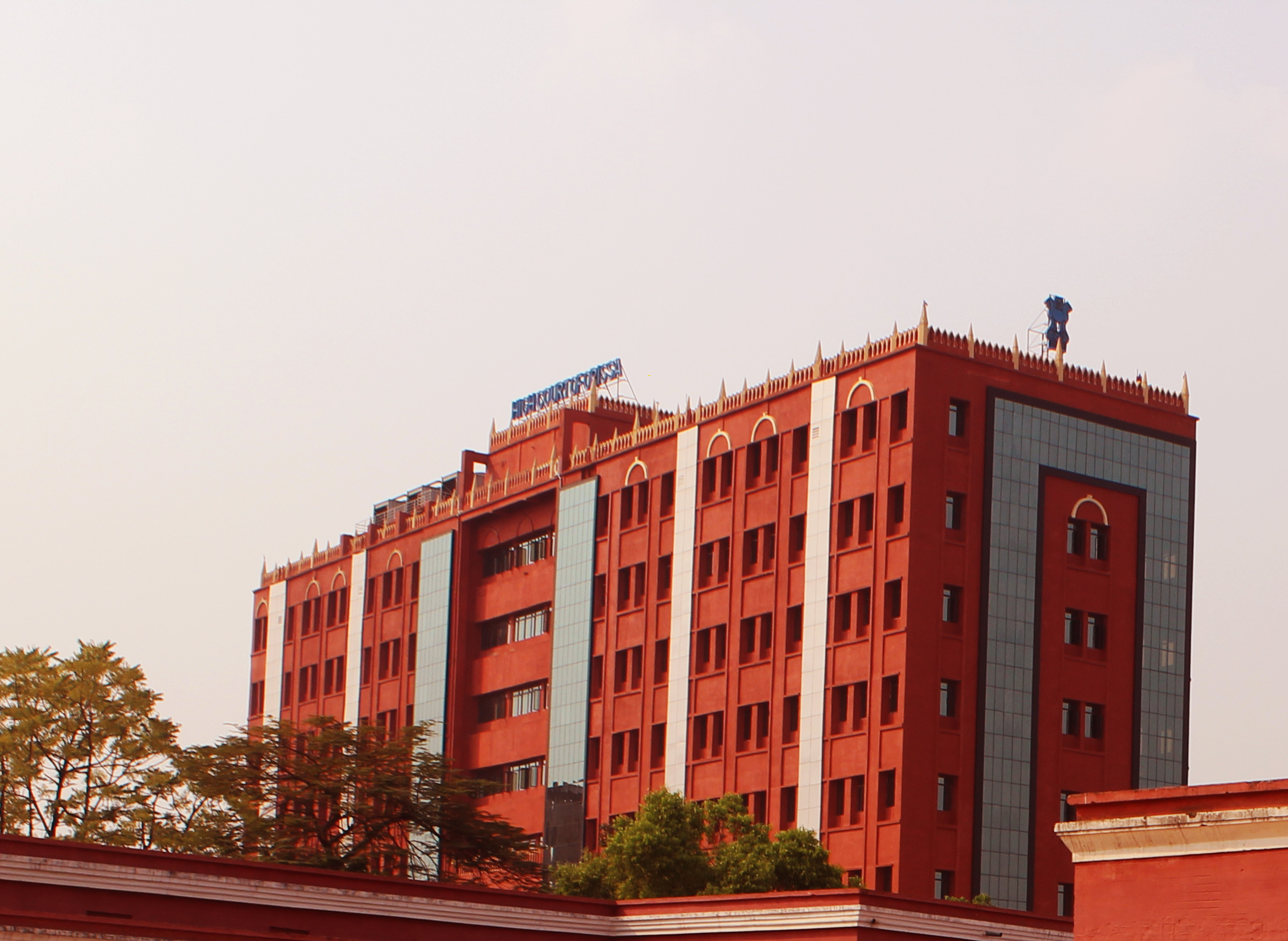
- Orissa High Court
- Interactive map of Chandni Chowk
- Coordinates: 20°27′52″N 85°51′29″E
- Country: India
- State: Odisha
- District: Cuttack
- City: Cuttack

Area
  - Total: 0.32 km^{2} (0.12 sq mi)
- Elevation: 0.32 m (1.0 ft)

Population
  - Total: 4,452
  - Density: 14,000/km^{2} (36,000/sq mi)
- Time zone: UTC+5:30 (IST)
- PIN code: 753002
- Vehicle registration: OD-05

Chandni Chowk in Cuttack is a wealthy neighbourhood. It has a population of 4,452 people and area of 0.32 square kilometres (0.12 sq mi). The Orissa High court, established on 26 July 1948, serves the highest judicial authority in the State. Sishu Bhawan is a hospital, treating children patients. The Regional Transport Office, is also situated here and is office headquarters of Cuttack District.

== Geography ==
Chandni Chowk is surrounded by many localities. Oriya Bazar and Mohammadia Bazaar at North, CDA area at West, and Nimchouri at East.

In addition, Chandni Chowk also borders Kathajodi River.

=== Climate ===
Climate data for Chandni Chowk, Cuttack (1991–2020, extremes 1901–2020)
Month	Jan	Feb	Mar	Apr	May	Jun	Jul	Aug	Sep	Oct	Nov	Dec	Year
Record high °C (°F)	36.6 (97.9)	40.1 (104.2)	42.8 (109.0)	45.0 (113.0)	47.7 (117.9)	47.2 (117.0)	42.3 (108.1)	38.4 (101.1)	41.1 (106.0)	40.0 (104.0)	36.9 (98.4)	33.7 (92.7)	47.7 (117.9)
Mean daily maximum °C (°F)	28.7 (83.7)	32.0 (89.6)	35.4 (95.7)	37.0 (98.6)	37.4 (99.3)	35.0 (95.0)	32.2 (90.0)	32.0 (89.6)	32.6 (90.7)	32.4 (90.3)	30.8 (87.4)	28.8 (83.8)	32.9 (91.2)
Mean daily minimum °C (°F)	14.3 (57.7)	17.7 (63.9)	21.6 (70.9)	23.8 (74.8)	25.0 (77.0)	24.8 (76.6)	24.0 (75.2)	23.9 (75.0)	23.8 (74.8)	22.3 (72.1)	18.3 (64.9)	14.3 (57.7)	21.1 (70.0)
Record low °C (°F)	5.8 (42.4)	8.5 (47.3)	13.0 (55.4)	13.5 (56.3)	16.5 (61.7)	17.0 (62.6)	18.2 (64.8)	17.5 (63.5)	17.0 (62.6)	14.0 (57.2)	10.0 (50.0)	7.5 (45.5)	5.8 (42.4)
Average rainfall mm (inches)	14.0 (0.55)	16.6 (0.65)	23.8 (0.94)	45.0 (1.77)	106.0 (4.17)	196.0 (7.72)	361.4 (14.23)	365.0 (14.37)	258.4 (10.17)	176.2 (6.94)	31.4 (1.24)	4.1 (0.16)	1,598 (62.91)
Average rainy days	0.7	1.2	1.6	3.0	5.1	9.6	15.0	15.6	12.0	6.8	1.7	0.4	72.8
Average relative humidity (%) (at 17:30 IST)	55	50	52	59	61	70	79	81	79	73	65	58	65
Source: India Meteorological Department

== Administration, Judicial and Justice ==
=== History ===
Orissa was originally part of Bengal Presidency. On 22 March 1912, the new provinces of Bihar and Orissa was formed but, it remained under Calcutta Jurisdiction. On 9 February 1916, Orissa was placed under Patna's High Court Jurisdiction. Madhusudan Das Utkala Gourav said that a permanent bench would be soon in the capital—Cuttack. 26 July 1938, the high court bar association at Cuttack passed a resolution demanding a separate court for the province. A committee formed in 1942, published it's report on 31 December 1943, stating that creating a separate high court would led to more faster and convenient administration. On 30 April 1948, Governor General of India issued the Orissa High Court Order, providing for the constitution of the high court for Orissa.

== Demographics ==
Gender in Chandni Chowk:
1. Female 2,145 (48.2%)
2. Male 2,307 (51.8%)

Chandi Chowk has a population of 4,452 people and Population Density is approximately 14,000 inhabitants per square kilometre (36,000/sq mi).

== Transport ==
=== Railways ===
Most people in this locality prefer to use the Cuttack railway station. Cuttack Station provides connectivity to some parts, making it convenient for people going to other places.

People sometimes use Gopalpur Balikuda and Katha Jori Railway Stations for local.

=== Airways ===
Nearst airport is Biju Patnaik Airport located in Bhubaneswar. However it is overcongested since it is only main airport of Odisha, making it inconvenient for travellers.

== Healthcare ==
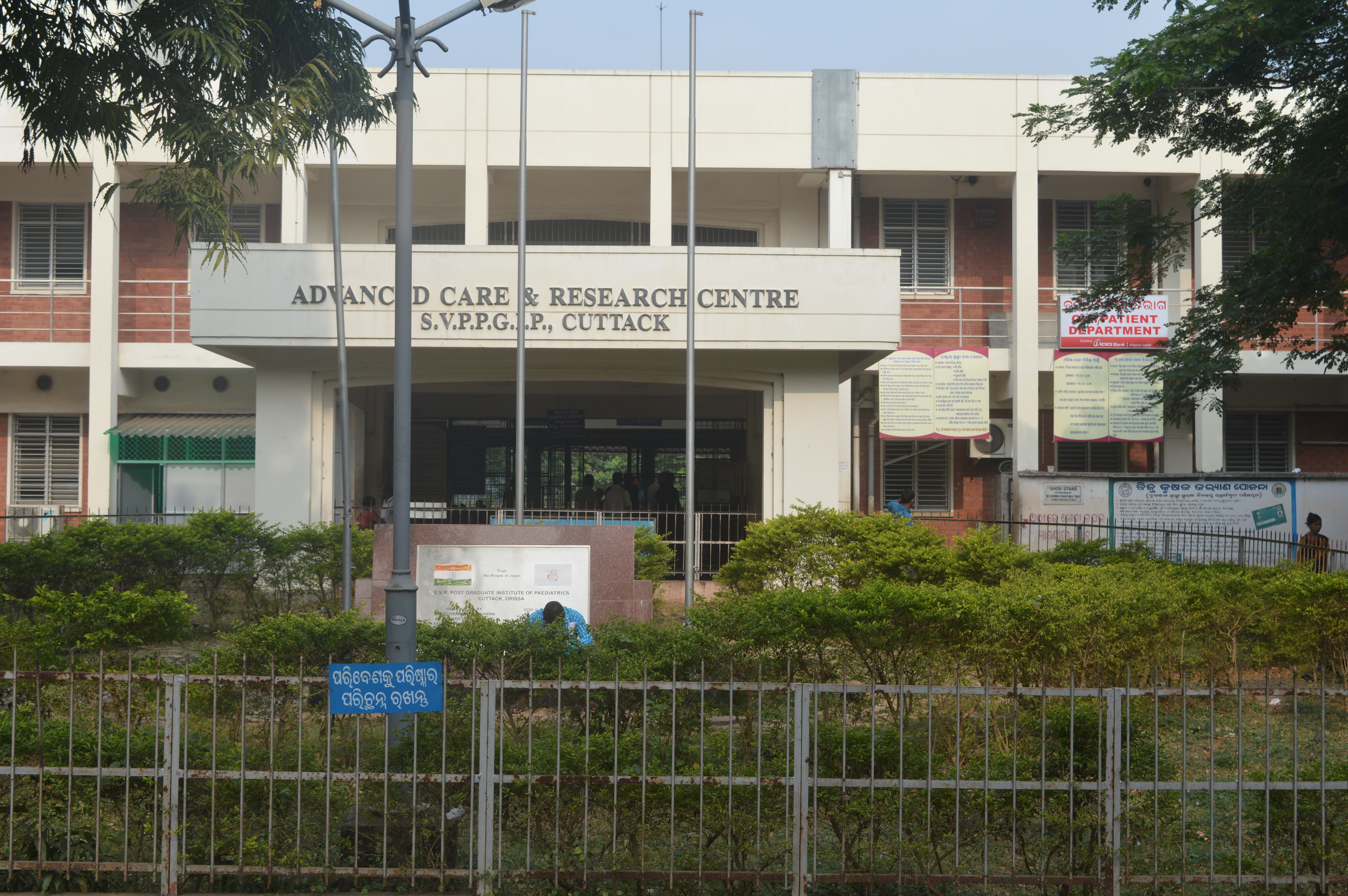
Sishu Bhawan Main Building

Sishu Bhawan, officially Sardar Vallabhbhai Patel Post Graduate Institute of Paediatrics, is a prominent pediatric hospital. It has undergone significant infrastructure but currently lacks dedicated trauma care facility for pediatric patients.

== Education ==
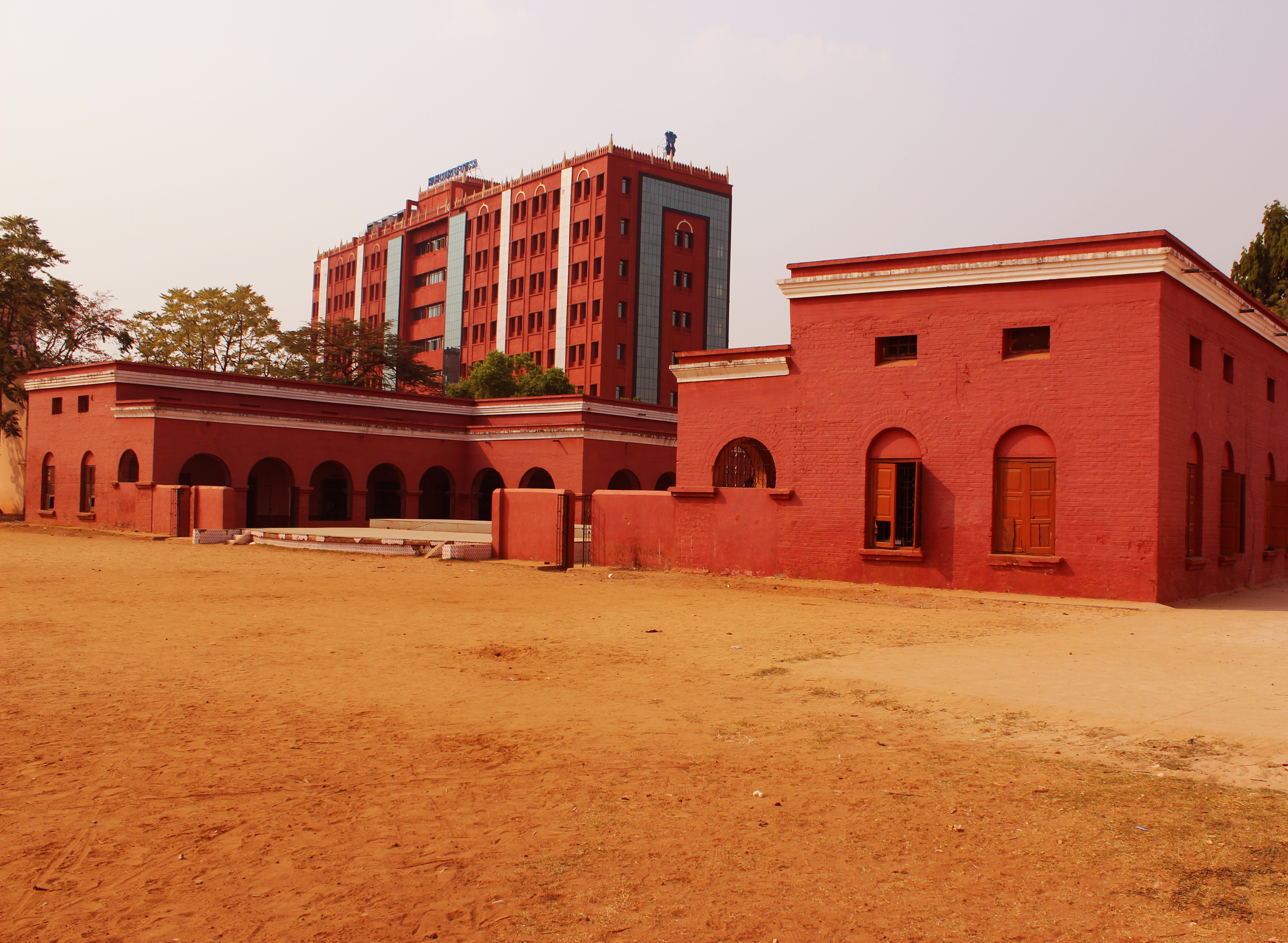
Ravenshaw Collegiate School

Chandni Chowk has following educational institutes:

1. Ravenshaw Collegiate School
2. R N T college

== Places of Interest ==
- Kathajodi Riverfront
- Ahimsa Gandhi Park

== See also ==
• Cuttack
