= Konark Express =

Train in India

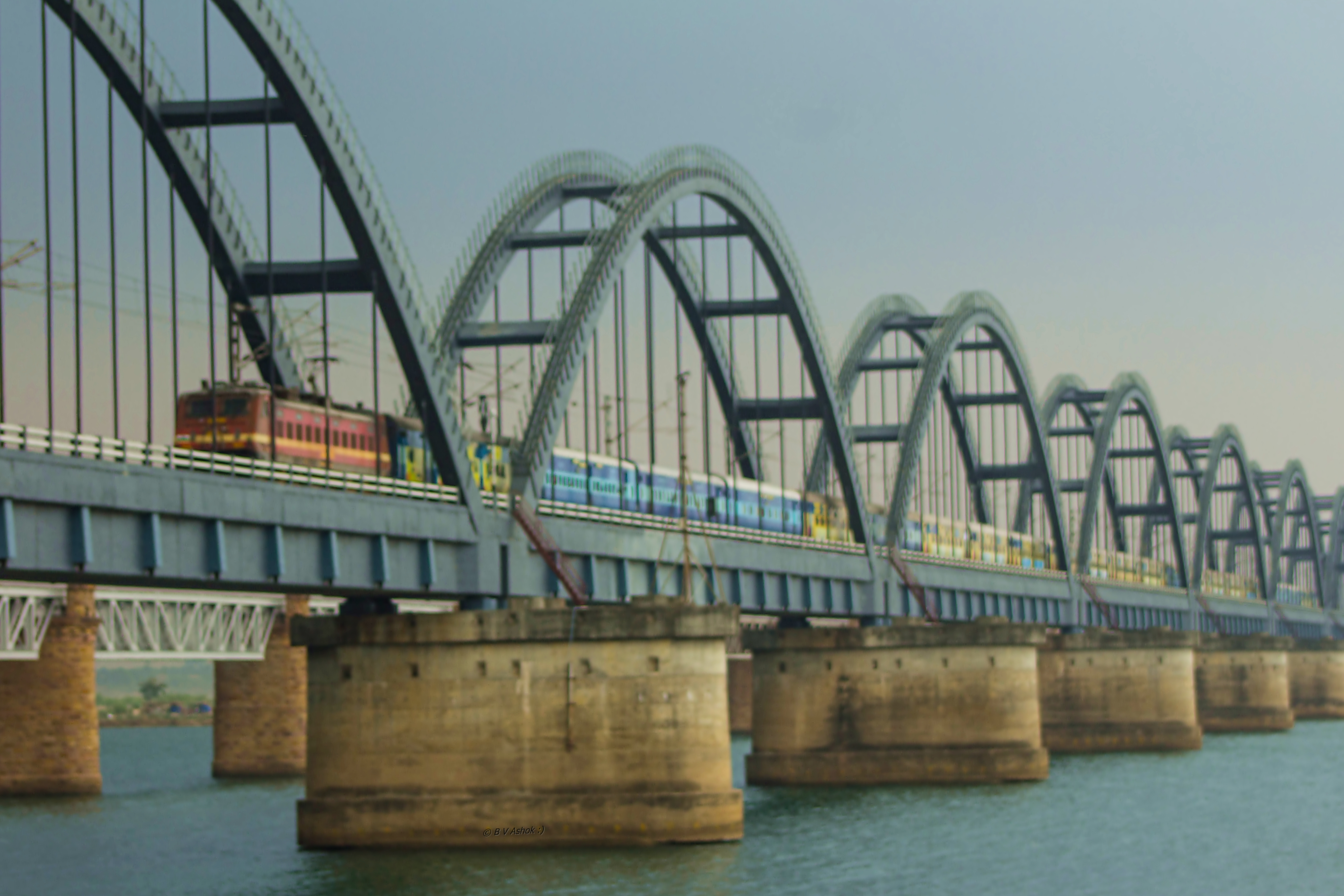
- Konark Express over Godvari Arch bridge

Overview
- Service type: Express
- Locale: Odisha, Andhra Pradesh, Telangana, Karnataka & Maharashtra
- First service: 16 August 1978; 47 years ago (initial service between Bhubaneswar and Secunderabad)
- Current operator: Central Railway

Route
- Termini: Bhubaneswar New (BBSN); Mumbai CSMT (CSMT)
- Stops: 39
- Distance travelled: 1,932 km (1,200 mi)
- Average journey time: 37 hours 15 minutes
- Service frequency: Daily
- Train number: 11019 / 11020

On-board services
- Classes: AC 2 Tier, AC 3 Tier, Sleeper Class, General Unreserved
- Seating arrangements: Yes
- Sleeping arrangements: Yes
- Catering facilities: Available
- Observation facilities: Large windows
- Baggage facilities: Available
- Other facilities: Below the seats

Technical
- Rolling stock: LHB coach
- Track gauge: 1,676 mm (5 ft 6 in)
- Operating speed: 58 km/h (36 mph) average including halts.
Route map
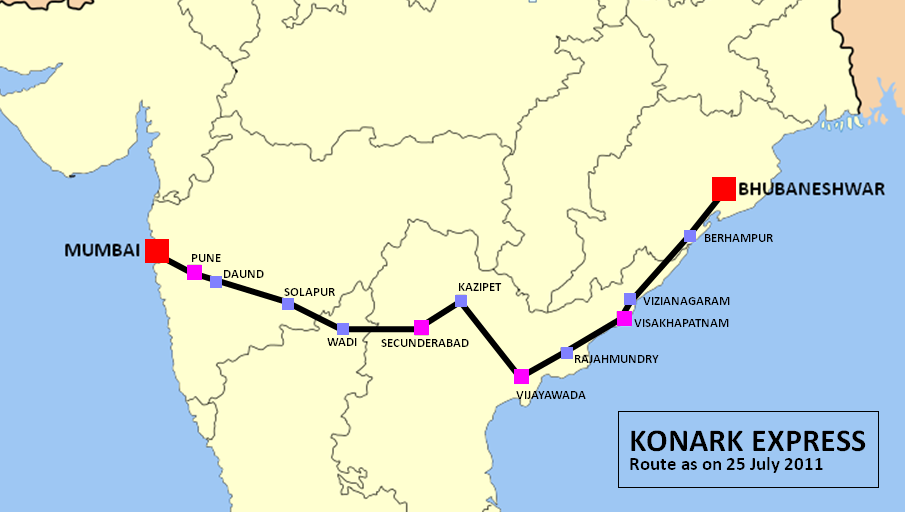

The 11019 / 11020 Konark Express is superfast express train running between Mumbai Chhatrapati Shivaji Maharaj Terminus (CSMT) and Bhubaneswar New (BBSN). It was introduced by Shri Madhu Dandavate in 1978 as a daily service between (SC) Secunderabad and Bhubaneswar (BBS). It used to run with train No 2119/2120 and shared rake with the 2101/2102 Minar Superfast Express which used to operate between Secunderabad and Bombay VT (now CSMT).

This train initially had the Navy-Blue livery with a white strip above its windows due to this rake sharing arrangement. With increase in demand of an exclusive train between Bombay and Bhubaneshwar, this train was extended up to Bombay VT in 1994 thus ending the rake sharing arrangement between 2101/2102 Minar Express (which was later replaced by the 2701/02 Hussainsagar Express). After extension this train was renumbered as 1019/1020 in 1994. It is one of the oldest trains connecting the eastern and western states of the country. Currently operating as 11019/11020, it connects Mumbai CSMT (formerly Chhatrapati Shivaji Terminus Mumbai) to Bhubaneswar New (Terminal recently being changed from Bhubaneswar (BBS) to Bhubaneswar New).

== Route & halts ==
- Chhatrapati Shivaji Maharaj Terminus
- Dadar
- Thane
- Kalyan Junction
- Pune Junction
- Daund Junction
- Solapur Junction
- Kalaburagi
- Wadi Junction
- Lingampalli
- Secunderabad Junction
- Kazipet Junction
- Warangal
- Mahbubabad
- Khammam
- Vijayawada Junction
- Eluru
- Rajahmundry
- Samalkot Junction
- Visakhapatnam Junction
- Vizianagaram Junction
- Srikakulam Road
- Palasa
- Brahmapur
- Khurda Road Junction
- Bhubaneswar
- Mancheswar
- Bhubaneswar New

The total distance travelled is 1,946 km (1,209 mi). It covers about 1,066 km (662 mi) in the state of erstwhile Andhra Pradesh (present Telangana and Andhra Pradesh) itself.

== Coach composition ==
- 1 AC 2-tier
- 5 AC 3-tier
- 9 Sleeper Class
- 4 Unreserved Second Class
- 1 AC Pantry Car (AC Hot Buffet)
- 2 EOG

It is maintained by Central Railways.

== Traction ==
- Earlier, due to part electrification, it used to get three locomotives:
1. Between Mumbai CSMT and Solapur, it was hauled by WDP-4D or WDG-4 locomotive of Pune shed (earlier it used to be hauled with WDP-4D and WDG-4 of Kalyan shed).
2. Between Solapur and Visakhapatnam, it was hauled by a WAP-7 / WAP-4 of Lallaguda shed or Vijayawada shed.
3. Between Visakhapatnam and Bhubaneswar, it was hauled by a WAP-7 / WAP-4 of Visakhapatnam shed.
- Since August 2022, Konark express is hauled end-to-end by electric traction:
1. Between Mumbai CSMT and Vijayawada, it is hauled by a WAP-7 of Kalyan shed or Lallaguda shed.
2. Between Vijayawada and Visakhapatnam, it is hauled by a WAP-7 of Lallaguda shed.
3. Between Visakhapatnam and Bhubaneswar, it is hauled by a WAP-7 of Visakhapatnam shed.

== Direction reversal ==
It reverses direction twice at;

1. Vijayawada Junction
2. Visakhapatnam Junction.

== Incidents ==
- On 31 July 2008, two people were injured when two coaches and the engine of Konark Express derailed at Gangapur station near Gulbarga. The cause of the derailment is yet unknown.
