= Nirakarpur railway station =

Railway station on the East Coast Railway network in India

Nirakarpur
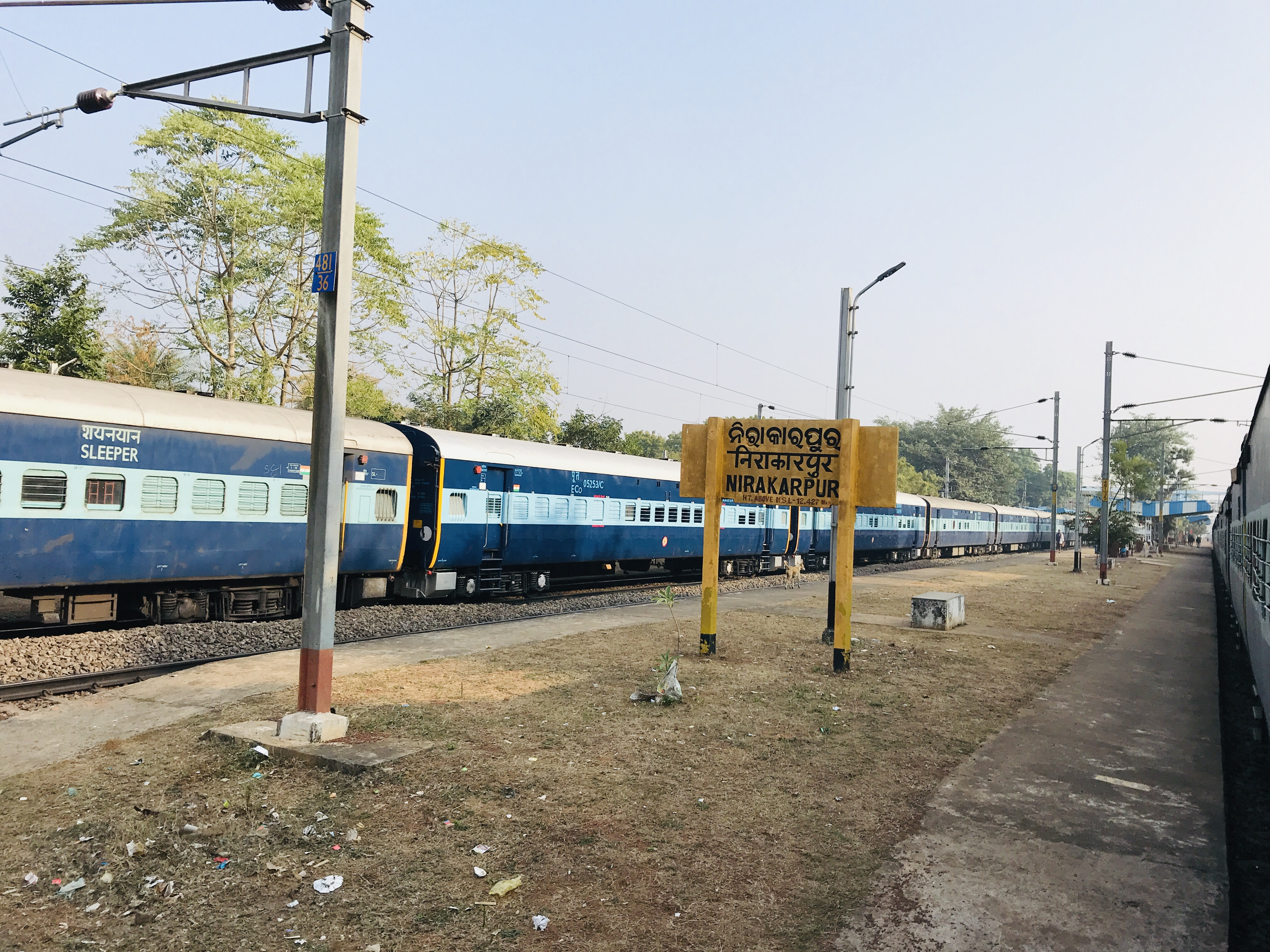

General information
- Location: Nirakarpur, Odisha; India
- Coordinates: 19°59′29″N 85°31′48″E
- System: Indian Railways station
- Owner: Ministry of Railways, Indian Railways
- Line: Howrah–Chennai main line
- Platforms: 4
- Tracks: 4

Construction
- Structure type: Standard (on ground)
- Parking: No

Other information
- Status: Functioning
- Station code: NKP
- Zone(s): East Coast Railway
- Division(s): Khurda Road
Location
- Location within India Location within Odisha

Nirakarpur railway station is a railway station on the East Coast Railway network in the state of Odisha, India. It serves Nirakarpur village. Its code is NKP. It has four platforms. Passenger, MEMU, Express trains halt at Nirakarpur railway station.

== Major trains ==
- East Coast Express
- Hirakhand Express
- Bhubaneshwar–Visakhapatnam Intercity Express
- Puri–Tirupati Express
- Rourkela–Gunupur Rajya Rani Express
- Visakha Express

== See also ==
- Khordha district

== Gallery ==
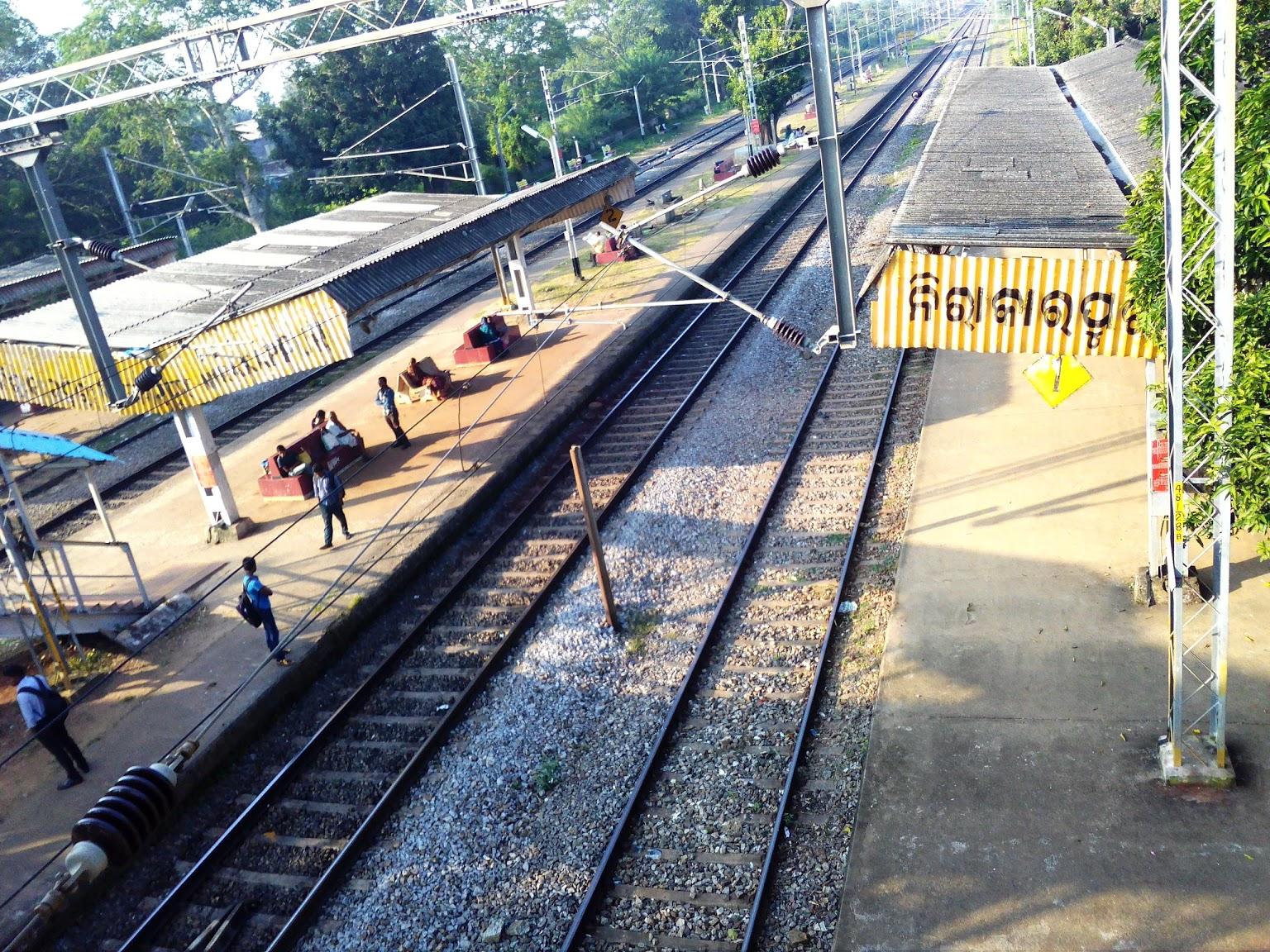
Nirakarpur railway station

Nirakarpur railway station

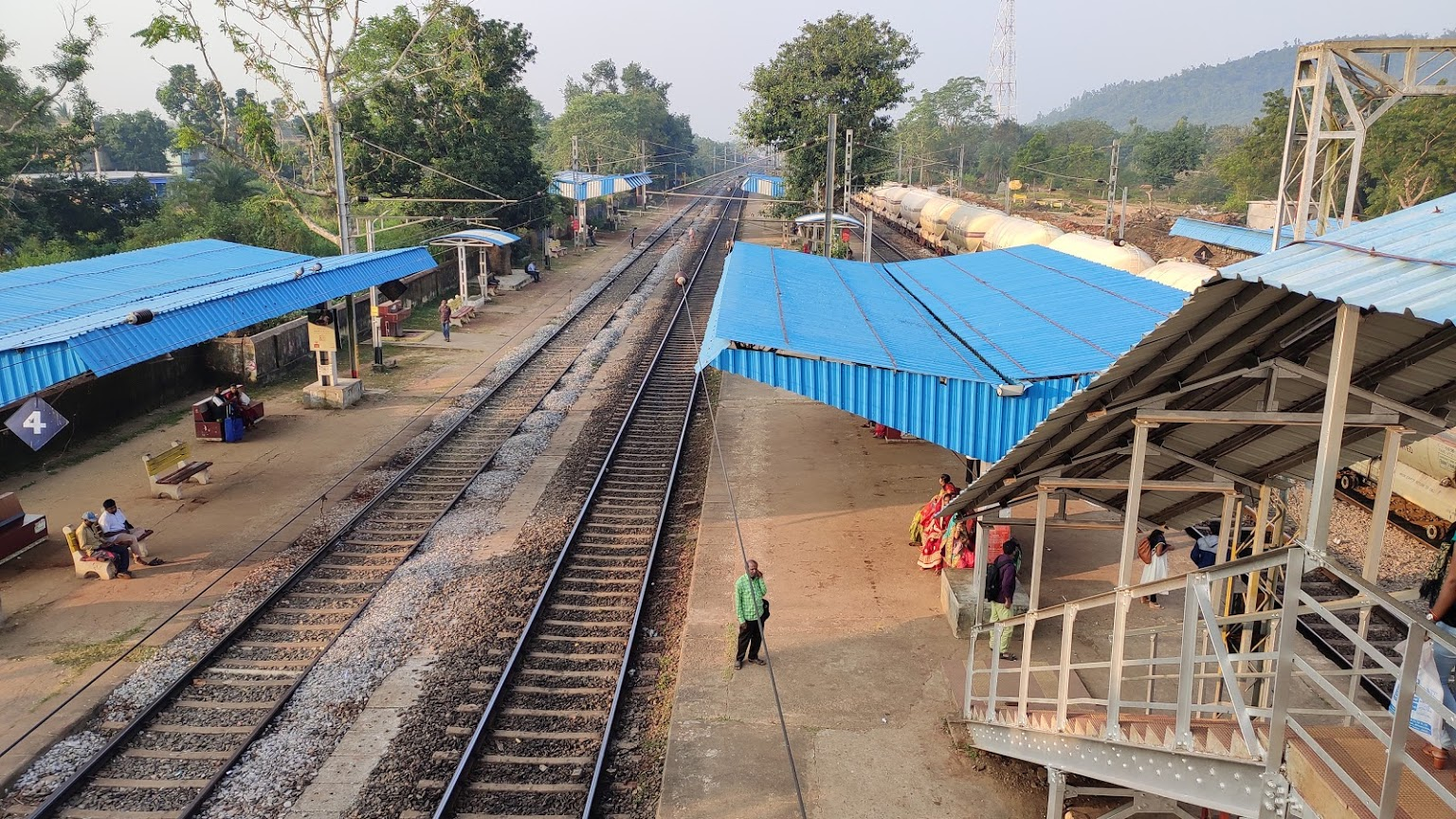
Nirakarpur railway station

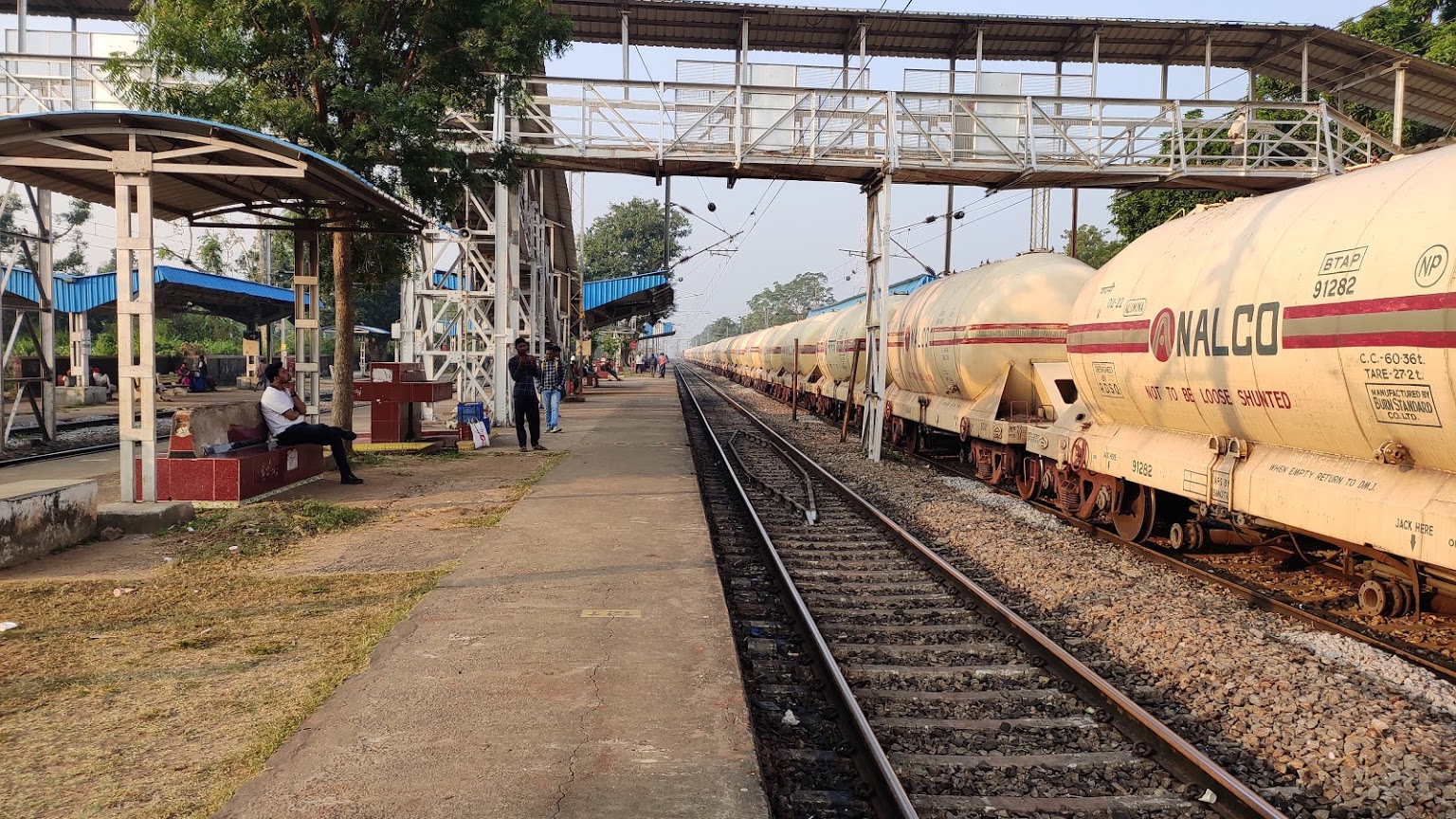
Nirakarpur railway station
