= Paralakhemundi railway station =

Railway Station in Odisha, India

Paralakhemundi
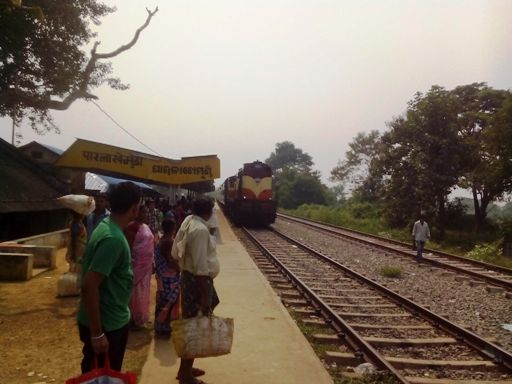
- Paralakhemundi Railway Station

General information
- Location: Paralakhemundi, Odisha; India
- Coordinates: 18°47′09″N 84°04′46″E
- Elevation: 60 m (197 ft)
- System: Indian Railways Station
- Owner: Indian Railways
- Operator: East Coast Railway
- Line: Naupada-Gunupur Section
- Platforms: 2
- Tracks: 2

Construction
- Parking: Available

Other information
- Status: Functioning
- Station code: PLH
- Zone(s): East Coast Railway
- Division(s): Waltair

History
- Opened: 1899-1900
Location
- Location within Odisha Location within India

Paralakhemundi railway station belongs to East Coast Railway of Waltair Division. It is located in Gajapati district of Odisha.This is the first odisha dedicated railway line as well as the FIRST ROYAL RAILWAY STATION of Odisha, established in 1899. The total section was established by Gajapati Maharaja of Paralakhemundi and it is first odisha Origin Railway station of Odisha state. This line was the first lite rail line of eastern india otherwise known as Parlakimedi Light Railway PLR, one of the oldest station in odisha. This is the first Lite Railway station of odisha. After five years, Mayurbhanj State Railway came in to existence. Hence, it was the first Narrow gauge railway station of Odisha.There are currently four trains running through this station as of 2025

== History ==
Paralakhemundi Light Railway was a two-foot six-inch gauge railway. The Maharaja of Paralakhemundi decided to connect his capital with Naupada which was only 40 km (25 mi) away. With the government giving its sanction in 1898, work began in fully. The line was opened to traffic in 1900. This railway line was built at a cost of Rs 700,000. In the starting years, the Parlakhimidi Railway had incurred losses but after 1910, it started making marginal profits and after 1924–1925, the profits increased. This motivated the Maharaja's son Krushna Chandra Gajapati to extend the line to Gunupur in two phases in 1929 and 1931. It was later merged with Bengal Nagpur Railway.

== Railway reorganization ==
After Indian Independence it was merged with North Eastern Railway. surveys were undertaken for broad-gauge conversion in 1950 and again in 1964 and 1967. The foundation stone was finally laid for the Naupada–Gunupur gauge conversion work at Naupada on 27 September 2002. With effect from 1 April 2003, it became a part of the newly formed East Coast Railway. The line was finally closed for gauge conversion on 9 June 2004. Services were restarted on 22 August 2011 with the introduction of Puri–Gunupur Passenger.
