= Dusi, Srikakulam district =

Dusi
- village
- Interactive map of Dusi
- Location in Andhra Pradesh, India Dusi (India)
- Coordinates: 18°22′15″N 83°51′31″E
- Country: India
- State: Andhra Pradesh
- District: Srikakulam

Population (2001)
  - Total: 2,718

Languages
  - Official: Telugu
- Time zone: UTC+5:30 (IST)
- PIN: 532484
- Telephone code: 08942
- Nearest city: Srikakulam
- Sex ratio: 0.96 ♂/♀
- Vidhan Sabha constituency: Amdalavalasa

Dusi is a village and panchayat in Amadalavalasa mandal in Srikakulam district in the Indian state of Andhra Pradesh.

== Geography ==
Dusipeta is a village located on the banks of River Nagavali (Languliya). This is close to Mandal headquarters Amadalavalasa and District Headquarters Srikakulam in Andhra Pradesh.

This village was once upon a time very famous for drama artists and singers. The people are hardworking with more enthusiasm towards higher education and sports. Most of the employees work in state government jobs such as teachers, police, forest, and doctors. The youth well participate in volleyball tournaments mostly held on the banks of the river Nagavali when the river dries for few months before the monsoon begins.

The land yields three crops per year and was previously known for mango and coconut trees. Industrial development has reduced the vegetation and increased air pollution.

There are two political parties strong in village politics, YSR Congress Party and Telugu Desam Party while this village falls under the Amadalavalasa Constituency of the Andhra Pradesh Legislative Assembly. The funds for the village Panchayat will be allocated from the state government along with central assistance. Most of the roads are well laid with cement concrete as part of the government initiative.

The village has good connectivity to reach Amadalavalasa and Srikakulam in less than 15 minutes by road with good connectivity towards Palakonda, Visakhapatnam. The train station is DUSI, which was once visited by the Mahatma Gandhi but was neglected by the subsequent Governments in the Railways due to Operational reasons. The station is being developed with the platform upgrades. Majority of the Passenger trains stop while the Mail and Express trains will only stop in Amadalavalasa, which can be reached by road in 15 minutes.

== Demographics ==
As of 2001 it had a population of 2,718 in 670 households.[1]

More than 95% of the panchayat has the CC roads laid and water connection for majority of the households for drinking water.

The villagers celebrate Sankranti with their near and dear along with the local festivals- "Asirithalli" festival of the village goddesses in grand manner. The village is also home for rear temple like, "Trimurthulu- Brahma, Vishnu, Maheshwara" which was renovated three years ago, while the other famous temples are Shiva and Srinivasa.

== Economy ==
There is a large scale steel plant located at Dusi owned by Concast Ferro Inc. However, due to financial difficulties the plant was finally shutdown from 2021.

The majority of the people work in State Government jobs or Central Government jobs like Indian Railways. The women utilise the self-help groups financed by the State Government. The village also has a few labourers who work on daily wages. The elderly receive the pension from the State Government. The youth can give their best provided an opportunity.

The direct income for the Village Panchayat in the form of taxes is from the Concat Ferro which is very minimal. Sand was once upon an income for the local panchayat based on the government policies change from time to time. Best time to visit is during the monsoon and winter. The summers are very hot hear with temperatures soaring to around 45 degrees.

== Transportation ==
The village has good connectivity to reach Amadalavalasa and Srikakulam in less than 15 minutes by road with good connectivity towards Palakonda, Visakhapatnam. Dusi railway station is situated on Khurda Road–Visakhapatnam section, part of the Howrah-Chennai main line under Waltair railway division of East Coast Railway zone.
