= Thadivalasa =

Thadivalasa or Tadivalasa (Village ID 581558) is a village located in Ponduru Mandal, Srikakulam district, Andhra Pradesh, India and about 18 kilometres (11 mi) from Srikakulam Town. Thadivalasa is connected with railway station DUSI RS (which is a passenger train halt) located on the Howrah-Chennai mainline in East Coast Railway, Indian Railways, about 3 kilometres (1.9 mi) from the village. According to the 2011 census it has a population of 2859 living in 727 households. Its main agriculture product is paddy growing.
