= Lihuri railway station =

Railway station in Odisha, India

Lihuri

General information
- Location: District: Gajapati, Odisha; India
- Coordinates: 18°54′48″N 83°50′58″E
- Line: Naupada-Gunupur section
- Tracks: 5 ft 6 in (1,676 mm) broad gauge

Construction
- Structure type: Standard (on-ground station)
- Parking: Available

Other information
- Station code: LRI
- Zone(s): East Coast Railway
- Division(s): Waltair

History
- Former names: Paralakhemedi Light Railway
Location
- Location within Odisha Location within India

Lihuri station is located in Naupada–Gunupur branch line on the Odisha–Andhra border.

== Geography ==
Location of Lihuri station is under limits of Odisha but Lihuri village is located in Srikakulam district of Andhra Pradesh. People have to ferry across River Vamsadhara (Bansadhara) to reach Lihuri station from Lihuri village.

== History ==
The Paralakhemedi Light Railway opened the Naupada–Gunupur line between 1900 and 1931. The line was converted to broad gauge in 2011.

Preceding station	Indian Railways	Following station
Kashinagar towards ?	East Coast Railway zone Naupada–Gunupur branch line	Bansadhara towards ?
