= Buridikancharam =

- Village
- Interactive map of Buridikancharam
- Location in Andhra Pradesh, India
- Coordinates: 18°18′18″N 83°48′03″E
- Country: India
- State: Andhra Pradesh
- District: Srikakulam
- Mandal: Ponduru

Languages
  - Official: Telugu
- Time zone: UTC+5:30 (IST)

Buridikancharam is a village located in Ponduru mandal, Srikakulam district, Andhra Pradesh, India.

== Demographics ==
As per Population Census 2011, Buridikancharam village has population of 3026 of which 1545 are males and 1481 are females. Average Sex Ratio of the village is 959 which is lower than Andhra Pradesh state average of 993. Population of children with age 0-6 is 310 which makes up 10.24% of total population of village. Child Sex Ratio for the village is 1039, higher than Andhra Pradesh average of 939. Literacy rate of the village was 49.71% compared to 67.02% of Andhra Pradesh.
