= Gunupur railway station =

Railway station in Odisha, India

Gunupur
- Indian Railways logo

General information
- Location: Gunupur, Rayagada district, Odisha; India
- Coordinates: 19°24′43″N 83°29′01″E
- Elevation: 92 metres (302 ft)
- System: Indian Railways station
- Owner: Indian Railways
- Operator: East Coast Railways
- Line: Naupada-Gunupur section
- Platforms: 2
- Tracks: 2

Construction
- Structure type: Standard on ground
- Parking: Yes

Other information
- Status: Functioning
- Station code: GNPR
- Zone(s): East Coast Railway zone
- Division(s): Waltair

History
- Opened: 1931; 95 years ago
Location
- Location within Odisha Location within India

Gunupur railway station belongs to East Coast Railway of Waltair division.Maharaja of Paralakhemundi extended Naupada-Paralakhemundi line to Gunupur in 1931 AD. It is located at Gunupur in Rayagada district of Indian state of Odisha. Established by His highness Maharaja Krushna Chandra Gajapati of Paralakhemundi estate.

== History ==
Parlakimedi Light Railway was a 2 ft 6 in (762 mm) gauge railway. The Raja of Parlakimedi decided to connect his capital with Naupada which was only 40 km away. With the government giving its sanction in 1898, work began in full. The line was opened to traffic in 1900. This railway line was built at a cost of Rs 700,000. In the starting years, the Parlakhimidi Railway had incurred losses but after 1910, it started making marginal profits and after 1924–25, the profits increased. This motivated the Raja to extend the line to Gunupur in two phases in 1929 and 1931. It was later merged with Bengal Nagpur Railway. The narrow-gauge line was converted to broad gauge in the year 2011.

== Railway reorganization ==
After Indian Independence it was merged with North Eastern Railway. surveys were undertaken for broad gauge conversion in 1950 and again in 1964 and 1967. The foundation stone was finally laid for the Naupada–Gunupur gauge conversion work at Naupada on 27 September 2002. With effect from 1 April 2003 it became a part of the newly formed East Coast Railway. The line was finally closed for gauge conversion on 9 June 2004.

After a long wait, the work was completed and the first train from Gunupur, on broad-gauge line started on 21 August 2011. Services were restarted on 21 August 2011 with the introduction of Puri–Gunupur Passenger.

== Trains ==
As of 2025, there are four trains to and from Gunupur. Trains running from Gunupur railway station include:

- 18418 Gunupur–Puri Express DEP-(05:30)
- 58505 Gunupur–Visakhapatnam PASS Dep-13:40 hrs
- 68434 Gunupur-Cuttack MEMU PASS DEP-(03:00)
- 18118 GNPR ROU–RAJYARANI EXP (DEP-15:15)
