= Vani Vihar railway station =

Railway station in Odisha, India

Vani Vihar
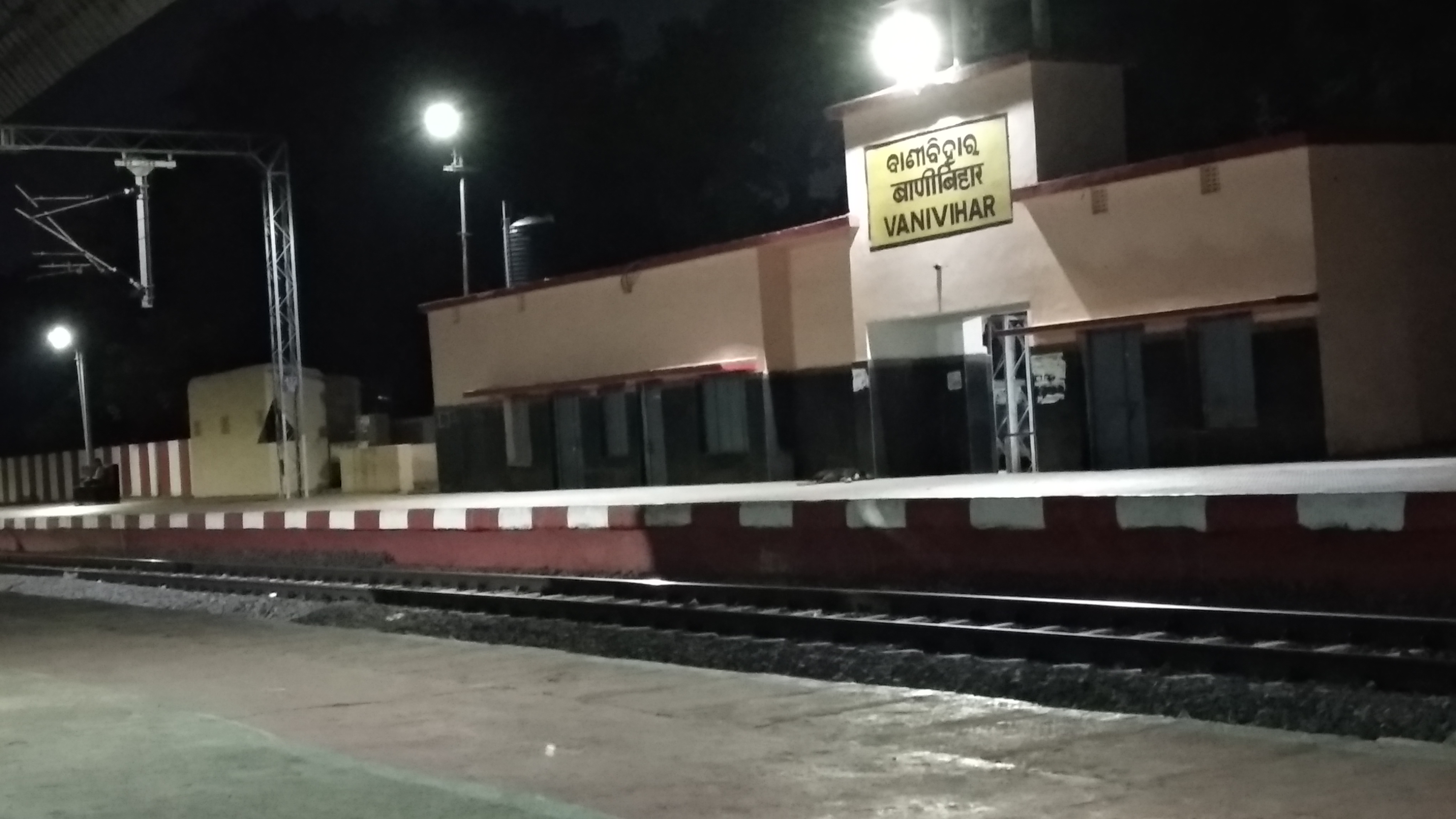

General information
- Location: Bhubaneswar, Odisha; India
- Coordinates: 20.2929°N 85.8532°E
- Elevation: 503 m (1,650 ft)
- System: Indian Railways station
- Owner: Indian Railways
- Operator: Khurda Road railway division
- Lines: Howrah–Chennai main line Kharagpur–Puri line
- Platforms: 2 BG
- Tracks: 4 BG
- Connections: Taxi stand, auto stand

Construction
- Structure type: Standard (on-ground station)
- Parking: Available
- Cycle facilities: Available
- Accessible: Disabled access

Other information
- Station code: BNBH
- Fare zone: East Coast Railways

History
- Electrified: 2002

Services
Preceding station	Indian Railways	Following station
Mancheswar towards Howrah Junction	East Coast Railway zone Howrah–Chennai main line	Bhubaneswar towards Chennai Central
Location
- Location within Odisha Location within India

Vani Vihar railway station is a small railway station in Saheed Nagar Bhubaneswar, Odisha. Its code is BNBH. The station consists of two platforms. The platforms are not well sheltered. It has a few facilities such as a non-computerised ticket counter, water supply, and urinals.

The main railway station of the city, Bhubaneswar railway station, is always preferred over Vani Vihar station for catching long-distance trains as only a few passenger trains halt here. Local people frequently use this station to cross from Saheed Nagar to Rasulgarh.

The station is named after the Vani Vihar area where the Vani Vihar University is located.
