= Patia railway station =

Railway station in Odisha, India

Patia

General information
- Location: Bhubaneswar, Odisha; India
- Coordinates: 20.3478°N 85.8413°E
- Elevation: 503 m (1,650 ft)
- System: Indian Railways station
- Owner: Indian Railways
- Operator: Khurda Road railway division
- Lines: Howrah–Chennai main line Kharagpur–Puri line
- Platforms: 3 BG
- Tracks: 4 BG
- Connections: Taxi stand, auto stand

Construction
- Structure type: Standard (on-ground station)
- Parking: Available
- Cycle facilities: Available

Other information
- Station code: PTAB
- Fare zone: East Coast Railways

History
- Electrified: 2002

Services
Preceding station	Indian Railways	Following station
New Bhubaneswar towards Howrah Junction	East Coast Railway zone Howrah–Chennai main line	Mancheswar towards Chennai Central
Location
- Location within Odisha Location within India

Patia railway station is a small railway station in Bhubaneswar, Odisha. Its code is PTAB. The station consists of two platforms. The platforms are not well sheltered. It lacks many facilities including water and sanitation.
