= Batuva =

Bathuva
- village
- Interactive map of Bathuva
- Location in Andhra Pradesh, India
- Coordinates: 18.340498°N 83.625531°E
- Country: India
- State: Andhra Pradesh
- District: Srikakulam

Languages
  - Official: Telugu
- Time zone: UTC+5:30 (IST)
- Postal code: 535125
- Vehicle Registration: AP30 (Former); AP39 (from 30 January 2019)

Bathuva is a village and panchayat in Ganguvari Sigadam mandal, Srikakulam district of Andhra Pradesh, India. There is a railway station at Bathuva in Chennai-Howrah mainline of East Coast Railway, Indian Railways. State Bank of India has a branch at Bathuva.
