= Ponduru =

- Census Town
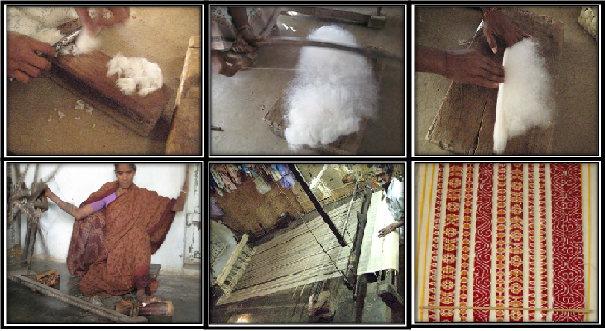
- Weaving at Ponduru
- Interactive map of Ponduru
- Country: India
- State: Andhra Pradesh
- District: Srikakulam

Area
  - Total: 11.07 km^{2} (4.27 sq mi)

Population (2011)
  - Total: 12,640
  - Density: 1,142/km^{2} (2,957/sq mi)

Languages
  - Official: Telugu
- Time zone: UTC+5:30 (IST)
- PIN: 532 168
- Telephone code: +91–8941
- Vehicle Registration: AP30 (Former); AP39 (from 30 January 2019)

Ponduru is a census town in Srikakulam district of the Indian state of Andhra Pradesh. The town is the mandal headquarters of Ponduru mandal in Srikakulam revenue division. It falls under the Amadalavalasa Assembly Constituency and Srikakulam Loksabha Constituency.

It is at a distance of 21 km (13 mi) from the district headquarters.

== Population ==
Ponduru town has total population of 12,640, of which 6,111 are males while 6,529 are females, as per the report released by Census India 2011.

== Education ==
The primary and secondary school education is imparted by government, aided and private schools, under the School Education Department of the state. Instruction is in English and Telugu in different schools.

== Ponduru khadi ==
Ponduru is famous for its khadi. The texture of handspun and handwoven khadi of this place is 125 count on account of its quality. Former freedom fighter Chowdary Satyanarayana gifted a dhoti made of Ponduru khadi to Mahatma Gandhi when he stopped in Dusi Railway Station in 1942 and Gandhi was impressed with the finesse of the khadi produced here. Later Gandhi sent his son Devdas Gandhi to Ponduru to study the process followed in making khadi textiles in this place.

== Transportation ==
=== Train service ===
Ponduru railway station is situated on Khurda Road–Visakhapatnam section, part of the Howrah-Chennai main line under Waltair railway division of East Coast Railway zone. All passenger trains and a couple of express trains halt in Ponduru Railway Station.

=== Bus service ===
Andhra Pradesh State Road Transport Corporation runs buses to Ponduru. It is well connected with Srikakulam District head quarters with regular bus services, both ordinary and express service.

=== Air service ===
The nearest airport is Visakhapatnam Airport which is around 100 km (62 mi) from Ponduru town which is around two and half hours drive by car.

== Villages ==
- Lolugu
- Kinthali
