= Bhubaneshwar–Visakhapatnam Intercity Express =

Train in India

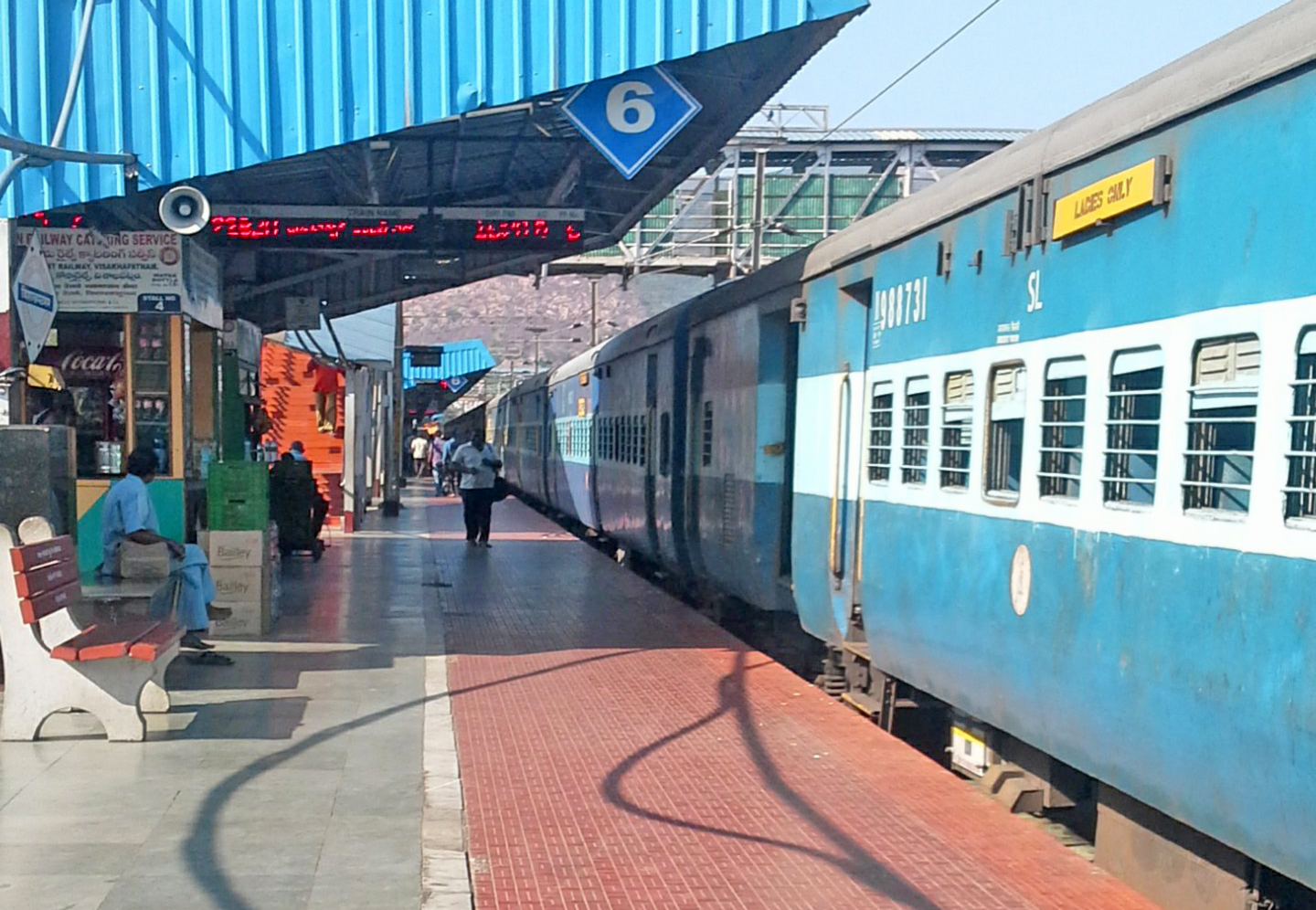

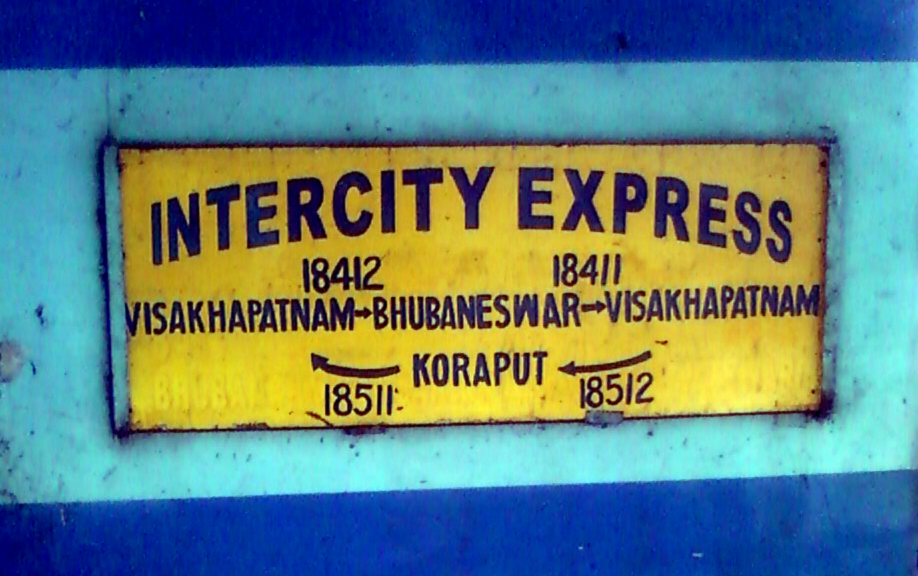

Overview
- Service type: Superfast Express
- Locale: Andhra Pradesh, Odisha
- First service: 2001
- Current operator: South Coast Railway

Route
- Termini: Visakhapatnam; Bhubaneswar New
- Stops: 25
- Distance travelled: 444 km (276 mi)
- Average journey time: 7 hours 45 minutes
- Service frequency: Daily
- Train number: 22819 / 22820

On-board services
- Classes: Second sitting, General Unreserved
- Seating arrangements: Yes
- Observation facilities: Standard Indian Railways coaches

Technical
- Rolling stock: Rake sharing 18511/18512 Visakhapatnam–Bhubaneshwar Intercity Express
- Track gauge: 1,676 mm (5 ft 6 in)
- Operating speed: 110 km/h (68 mph) maximum 56 km/h (35 mph), including halts
Route map
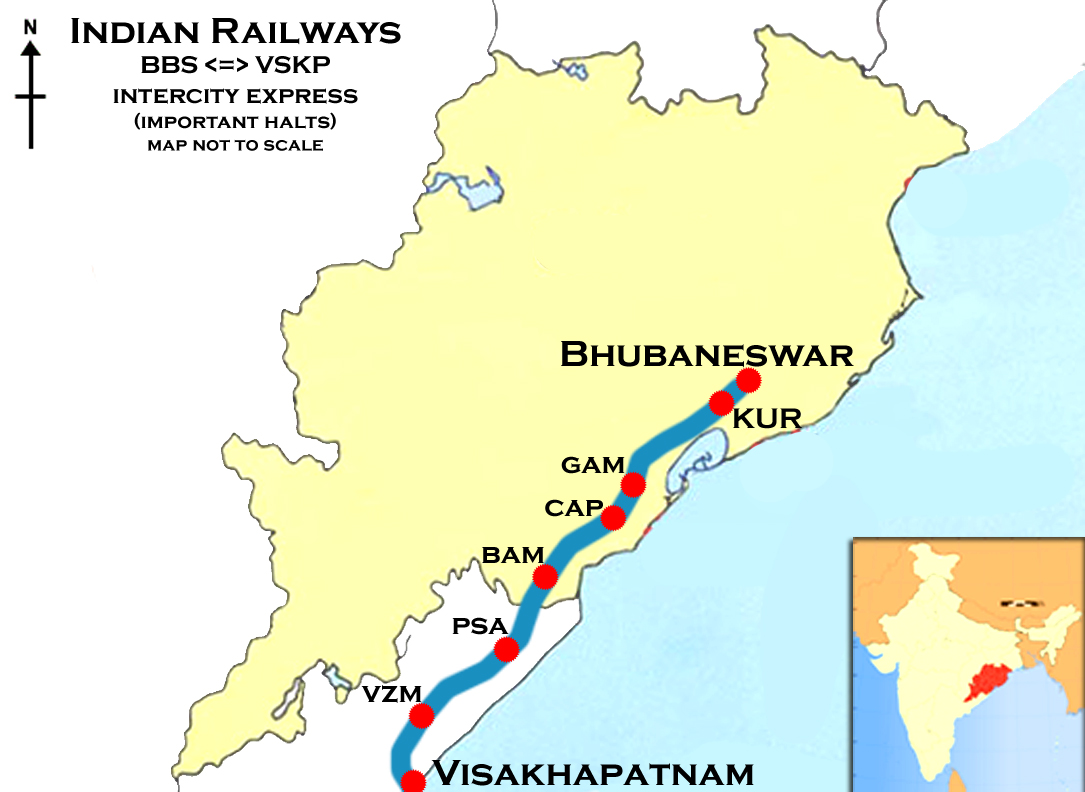

Bhubaneshwar–Visakhapatnam Intercity Express is a Superfast train running between Bhubaneswar New (BBSN) and Visakhapatnam along the eastern coastal region of India. This train was introduced in the year 2001 from Palasa to Bhubaneswar later it extended to Srikakulam, Visakhapatnam. Earlier it was numbered as 18411/18412 but it was renumbered as 22819/22820 in the year 2016.

== Coaches ==
It consists of 1 second sitting, 7 general second class, two guard cum luggage vans Coach composition from Bhubaneswar New to Visakhapatnam

Loco	1	2	3	4	5	6	7	8	9	10
	SLR	D1	UR	UR	UR	UR	UR	UR	UR	SLR

Coach composition from Visakhapatnam to Bhubaneswar New

10	9	8	7	6	5	4	3	2	1	Loco
SLR	D1	UR	UR	UR	UR	UR	UR	UR	SLR	

== Loco ==
It is hauled by WAP-4 / WAP-7 of Visakhapatnam Loco sheds.

== Trivia ==
During its inaugural in 2001, it ran 5 days a week between Bhubaneshwar and Palasa. After then it was extended to Srikakulam in the railway budget of 2002. Finally it was extended to Visakhapatnam in Railway Budget of 2004. After that its frequency was increased to 6 days a week. In 2012 it was made daily.
