= Ponduru railway station =

Railway station in Andhra Pradesh

General information
- Location: Ponduru, Srikakulam district, Andhra Pradesh; India
- Coordinates: 18.3628°N 83.7768°E
- Elevation: 39 m (128 ft)
- System: Passenger train station
- Owner: Indian Railways
- Operator: South Coast Railway
- Line: Howrah–Chennai main line
- Platforms: 5
- Tracks: 5

Construction
- Structure type: Standard (on-ground station)

Other information
- Status: Functioning
- Station code: PDU
- Zone(s): South Coast Railway zone
- Division(s): Visakhapatnam

History
- Opened: 1899
- Former names: East Coast State Railway

Services
| Preceding station | Indian Railways | Following station |
|---|---|---|
| Dusi towards Howrah Junction | South Coast Railway zone Howrah–Chennai main line | Sigadam towards Chennai Central |
Location
- Location within India Location within Andhra Pradesh

Ponduru railway station is a railway station on Khurda Road–Visakhapatnam section, part of the Howrah–Chennai main line under Visakhapatnam railway division of South Coast Railway zone. It is situated at Ponduru in Srikakulam district in the Indian state of Andhra Pradesh.

== History ==
In between 1893 and 1896, the coastal railway track from Cuttack to Vijayawada was built and opened to traffic by East Coast State Railway. The route was electrified in several phases. Khurda–Visakhapatnam section was completely electrified by 2002 and Howrah–Chennai route was fully electrified in 2005.
