= Naupada Junction railway station =

Railway station in Andhra Pradesh

Naupada Junction
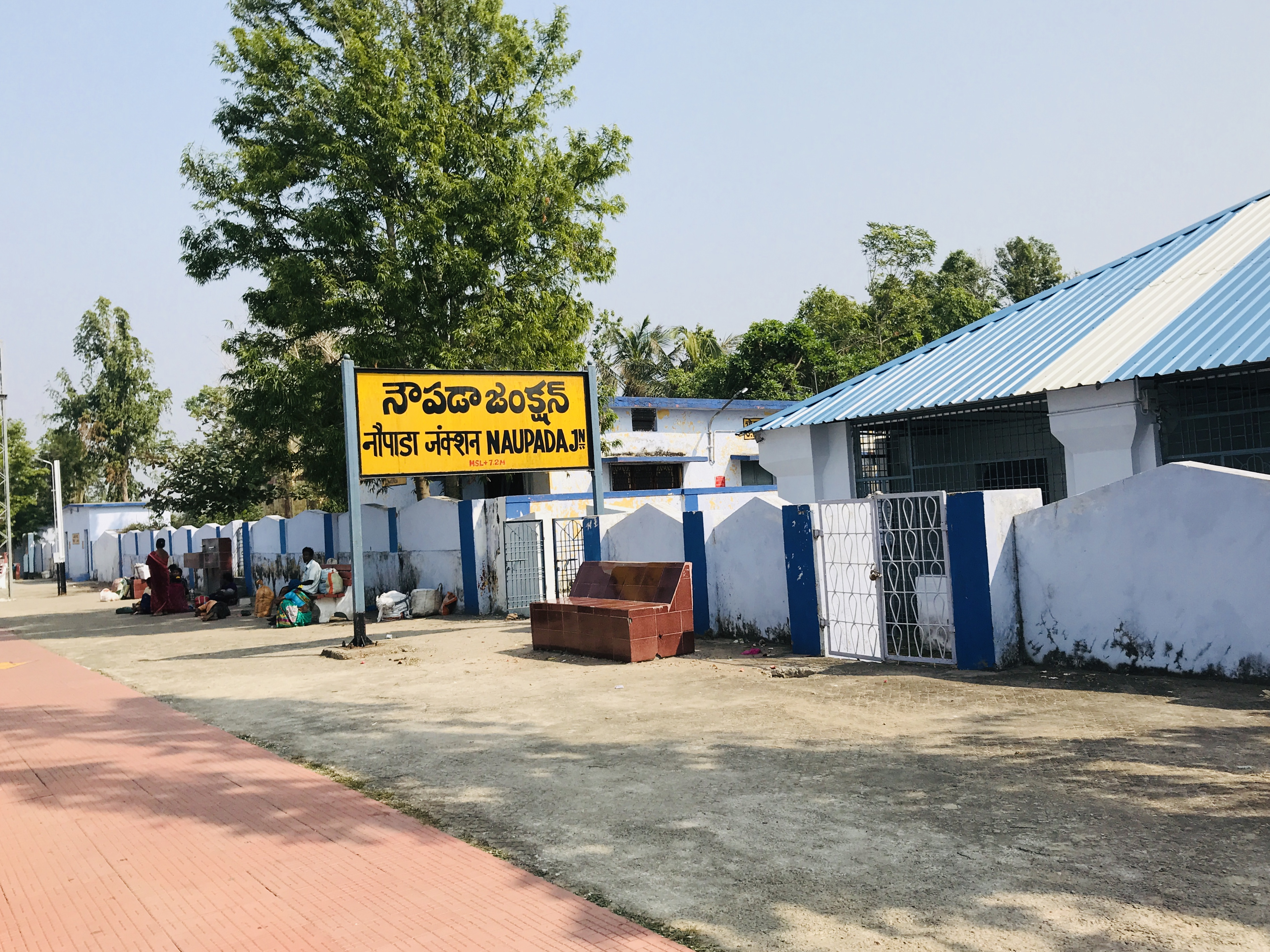
- Naupada station platform 1

General information
- Location: Nuapada, Srikakulam District. PH.No. 08945-249728 State: Andhra Pradesh; India
- Coordinates: 18°34′45″N 84°16′59″E
- Elevation: 12 m (39 ft)
- System: Indian Railways junction station
- Owner: Indian Railways
- Operator: Zone: SCoR
- Lines: Khurda Road–Visakhapatnam section of Howrah–Chennai main line Naupada–Gunupur branch line
- Platforms: 3
- Tracks: 5 ft 6 in (1,676 mm) broad gauge

Construction
- Structure type: Standard on ground station
- Parking: Available

Other information
- Status: Functioning
- Station code: NWP
- Zone(s): ECoR

History
- Opened: 1893–96
- Electrified: 1998–99
Location
- Location within Andhra Pradesh Location within India

Naupada Junction railway station (station code:NWP), located in the Indian state of Andhra Pradesh, serves Naupada in Srikakulam district. It is a junction station with a branch line to Gunupur in Rayagada district of Odisha which was built by Maharaja of Paralakhemundi.Former it was known as Parlakimedi Light Railway.

== History ==
During the period 1893 to 1896, 1,287 km (800 mi) of railway tracks covering the entire coastal stretch from Cuttack to Vijayawada, was built and opened to traffic by East Coast State Railway.Bengal Nagpur Railway's line to Cuttack was opened on 1 January 1899. The southern part of the East Coast State Railway (from Waltair to Vijayawada) was taken over by Madras Railway in 1901. The 514 km (319 mi)-long northern portion of the East Coast line to Cuttack, including the branch line to Puri, was taken over by Bengal Nagpur Railway in 1902.

The Paralakhemedi Light Railway opened Naupada–Gunupur line in 1900. The line was converted to broad gauge in 2011.

=== Railway reorganization ===
The Bengal Nagpur Railway was nationalized in 1944. Eastern Railway was formed on 14 April 1952 with the portion of East Indian Railway Company east of Mughalsarai and the Bengal Nagpur Railway. In 1955, South Eastern Railway was carved out of Eastern Railway. It comprised lines mostly operated by BNR earlier. Amongst the new zones started in April 2003 were East Coast Railway and South East Central Railway. Both these railways were carved out of South Eastern Railway.

== Infrastructure ==
Naupada Junction lies on the Palasa–Tilaru section, which was electrified in 1999–2000. Government has allotted ₹4 lakh (US$4,200) for the development of infrastructure in the station along with Srikakulam Road railway station.
