= Lolugu =

- village
- Interactive map of Lolugu
- Location in Andhra Pradesh, India
- Country: India
- State: Andhra Pradesh

Population (2011)
  - Total: 3,667

Languages
  - Official: Telugu
- Time zone: UTC+5:30 (IST)

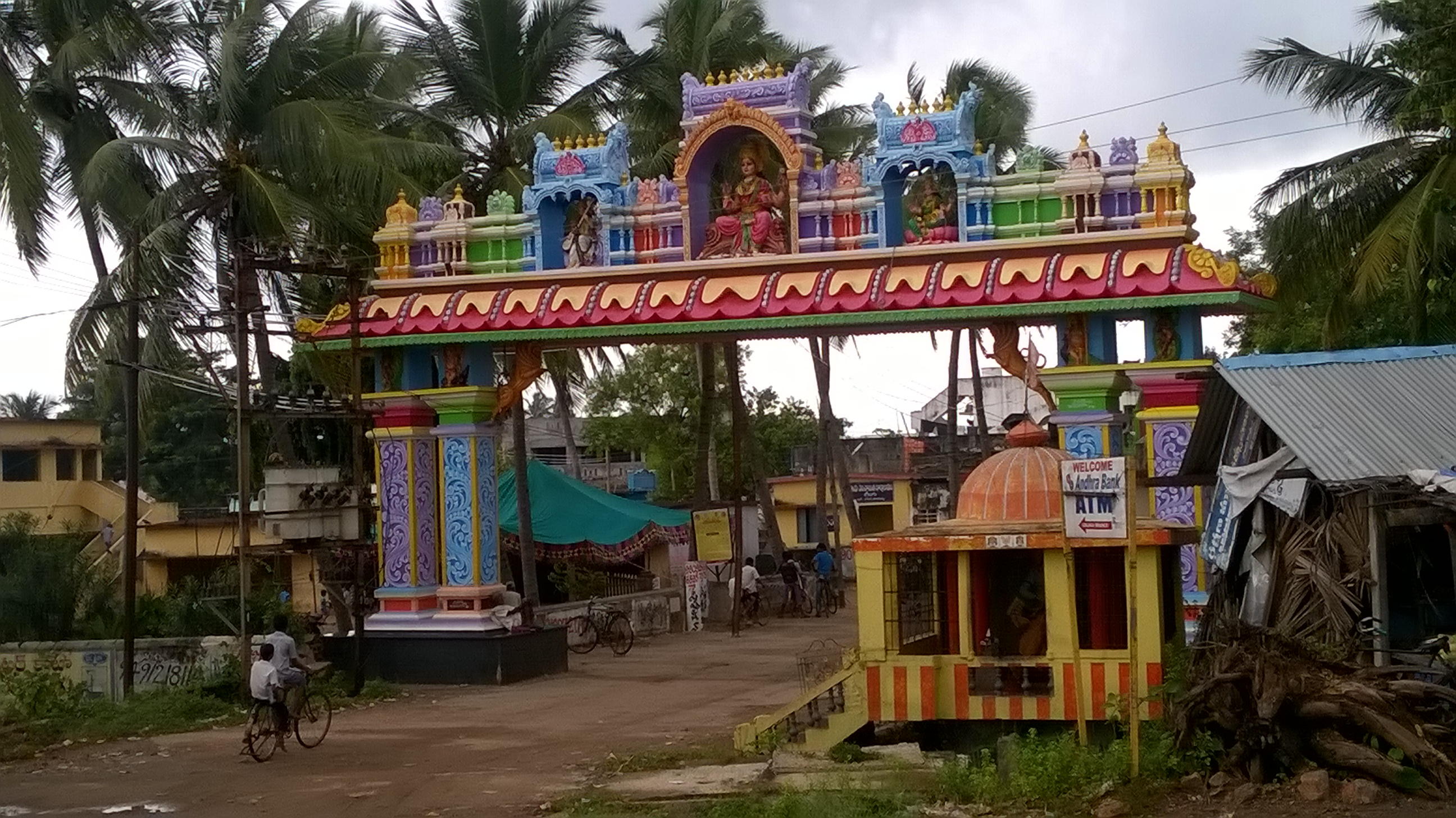
Lolugu village entrance gate

Lolugu is a village near Srikakulam town in Ponduru mandal division, Andhra Pradesh, India.

== Demographics ==
As of 2011 census, had a population of 3,667. The total population constitute, 1,850 males and 1,817 females —a sex ratio of 982 females per 1000 males. 396 children are in the age group of 0–6 years, of which 189 are boys and 207 are girls —a ratio of 1095 per 1000. The average literacy rate stands at 60.04% with 1,964 literates, significantly higher than the state average of 67.41%.
