= Naupada–Gunupur line =

Naupada–Gunupur section

Overview
- Status: Operational
- Owner: Indian Railways
- Locale: Andhra Pradesh, Odisha
- Termini: Naupada; Gunupur
- Stations: Parlakhemundi

Service
- Operator: South Coast Railway East Coast Railway

History
- Opened: 1931

Technical
- Track length: 90 km (56 mi)
- Number of tracks: 1
- Track gauge: 5 ft 6 in (1,676 mm) broad gauge
- Electrification: Yes
- Operating speed: 100 km/h

Naupada–Gunupur railway line belongs to East Coast Railway of Waltair division.

== History ==
The Parlakhemundi Light Railway was a two-foot six-inch gauge railway. The Raja of Parlakhemundi decided to connect his capital with Naupada which was only 40 km away. With the government giving its sanction in 1898, work began in fully. The line was opened to traffic in 1900. This railway line was built at a cost of Rs 700,000. In the starting years, the Parlakhemundi Railway had incurred losses but after 1910, it started making marginal profits and after 1924–25, the profits increased. This motivated the Raja to extend the line to Gunupur in two phases in 1929 and 1931. It was later merged with Bengal Nagpur Railway.

== Railway reorganization ==
After Indian Independence it was merged with South Eastern Railway. surveys were undertaken for broad-gauge conversion in 1950 and again in 1964 and 1967. The foundation stone was finally laid for the Naupada–Gunupur gauge conversion work at Naupada on 27 September 2002. With effect from 1 April 2003 became a part of the newly formed East Coast Railway. The line was finally closed for gauge conversion on 9 June 2004.

== Train services ==
After gauge conversion Puri–Gunupur Passenger was inaugurated on 22 August 2011. Palasa–Gunupur Passenger was inaugurated on 21 July 2012. A new Passenger train to Visakhapatnam was announced in Rail budget 2013–14.
