= Katha Jori railway station =

Railway station in Odisha

General information
- Location: Badam Badi Road, Madhu Patna Colony, Cuttack, Cuttack district, Odisha; India
- Coordinates: 20.45107°N 85.896353°E
- Elevation: 27 m (89 ft)
- System: Passenger train station
- Owner: Indian Railways
- Operator: East Coast Railway
- Lines: Howrah–Chennai main line Kharagpur–Puri line
- Platforms: 2
- Tracks: 2

Construction
- Structure type: Standard (on ground station)

Other information
- Status: Functioning
- Station code: KTJI
- Zone(s): East Coast Railway zone
- Division(s): Khurda Road railway division

History
- Opened: 1901
- Former names: East Coast State Railway

Services
Preceding station	Indian Railways	Following station
Cuttack Junction towards Howrah Junction	East Coast Railway zone Howrah–Chennai main line	Gopalpur Balikuda towards Chennai Central
Location
- Location within India Location within Odisha

Katha Jori railway station is a railway station on Kharagpur–Puri line, part of the Howrah–Chennai main line under Khurda Road railway division of East Coast Railway zone. It is situated beside Badam Badi Road at Madhu Patna Colony, Cuttack in Cuttack district in the Indian state of Odisha.

== History ==
In between 1893 and 1896 the East Coast State Railway constructed Howrah–Chennai main line. Kharagpur–Puri branch was finally opened for public in 1901. The route was electrified in several phases. In 2005, Howrah–Chennai route was completely electrified.
