= Ganguvari Sigadam =

- Village
- Interactive map of Ganguvari Sigadam
- Location in Andhra Pradesh, India Ganguvari Sigadam (India)
- Coordinates: 18.3833°N 83.6833°E
- Country: India
- State: Andhra Pradesh
- District: Srikakulam
- Elevation: 38 m (125 ft)

Languages
  - Official: Telugu
- Time zone: UTC+5:30 (IST)
- PIN: 532148
- Vehicle Registration: AP30 (Former); AP39 (from 30 January 2019)

Ganguvari Sigadam is a village in Srikakulam district of the Indian state of Andhra Pradesh. Surya Yalakala

== See also ==
- Batuva
