= Kinthali =

- Village
- Interactive map of Kinthali
- Location in Andhra Pradesh, India
- Coordinates: 18°19′51″N 83°51′13″E
- Country: India
- State: Andhra Pradesh
- District: Srikakulam

Area
  - Total: 4.58 km^{2} (1.77 sq mi)

Population (2011)
  - Total: 4,005
  - Density: 874/km^{2} (2,260/sq mi)

Languages
  - Official: Telugu
- Time zone: UTC+5:30 (IST)

Kinthali is a village in Srikakulam district of the Indian state of Andhra Pradesh. It is located in Ponduru mandal of Srikakulam revenue division.
