= Barang Junction railway station =

Railway station in Odisha

Barang Junction

General information
- Location: Barang, Odisha; India
- Coordinates: 20°22′52″N 85°50′09″E
- System: Indian Railways station
- Owner: Ministry of Railways, Indian Railways
- Line: Howrah–Chennai main line
- Platforms: 3
- Tracks: 9

Construction
- Structure type: Standard (on ground)
- Parking: No

Other information
- Status: Functioning
- Station code: BRAG
- Zone(s): East Coast Railway
- Division(s): Khurda Road
Location
- Location within India Location within Odisha

Barang Junction railway station is a railway station on the East Coast Railway network in the state of Odisha, India. It serves Barang town. Its code is BRAG. It has four platforms. Passenger, MEMU, Express trains halt at Barang Junction railway station.

== Major trains ==
- East Coast Express
- Sri Jagannath Express

== See also ==
- Cuttack district
