= Mancheswar railway station =

Railway station in Odisha, India

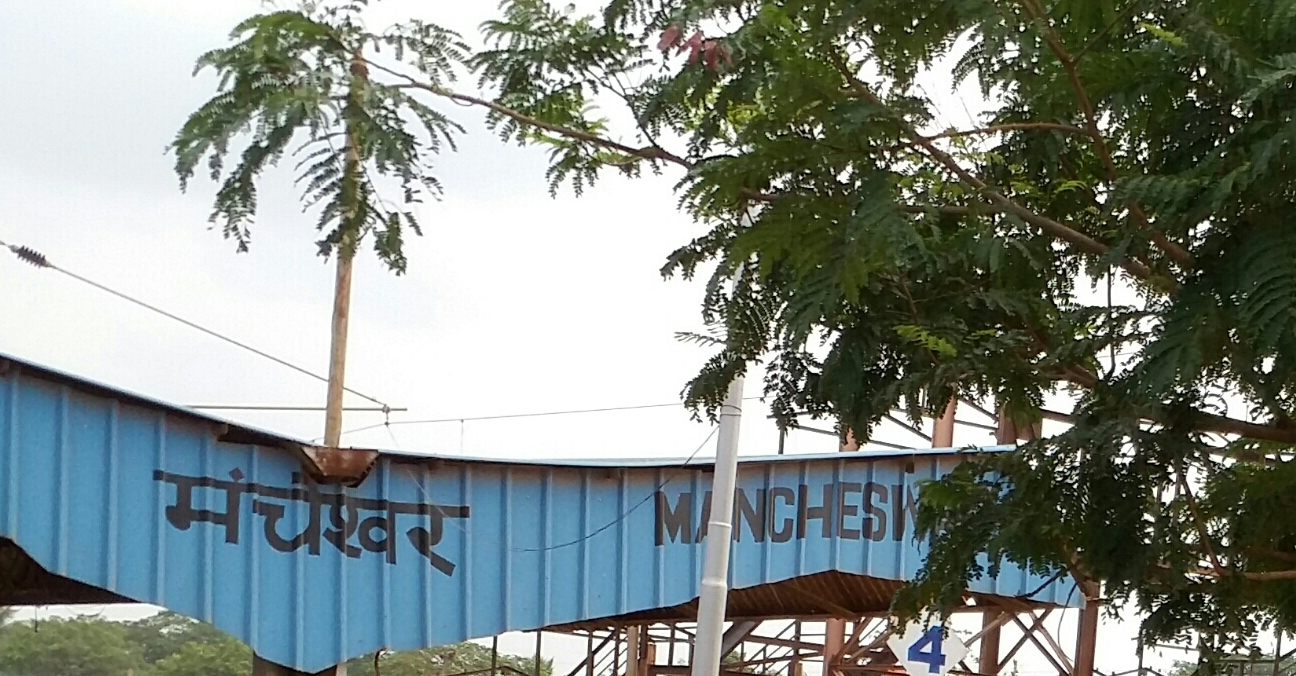
- Mancheswar railway station

General information
- Location: Bhubaneswar, Odisha; India
- Coordinates: 20.3223°N 85.8449°E
- Elevation: 29 m (95 ft)
- System: Indian Railways station
- Owner: Indian Railways
- Operator: Khurda Road railway division
- Lines: Howrah–Chennai main line Kharagpur–Puri line
- Platforms: 5
- Tracks: 6 broad gauge
- Connections: Taxi stand, Auto stand

Construction
- Structure type: Standard (on-ground station)
- Parking: Available
- Cycle facilities: Available
- Accessible: Disabled access

Other information
- Station code: MCS
- Fare zone: East Coast Railways

History
- Opened: 2002; 24 years ago
- Electrified: 2002

Services
Preceding station	Indian Railways	Following station
Patia towards Howrah Junction	East Coast Railway zone Howrah–Chennai main line	Vani Vihar towards Chennai Central
Location
- Location within Odisha Location within India

Mancheswar railway station is a railway station in Bhubaneswar, Odisha. Its code is MCS. The station consists of four platforms. The platform is not well sheltered; it lacks many facilities including water and sanitation. Trains like Paradeep–Visakhapatnam Weekly SF Express, Puri–Sai Nagar Shirdi Weekly Express, Puri–Durg Express, Puri–Ajmer Bi-Weekly Express, and Visakhapatnam–Tatanagar Weekly Express pass through the station.

== Railway Carriage Repair Workshop ==
The railway carriage repair workshop of East Coast Railway is at Mancheswar railway station. It also houses a basic training center which was established in 1989 to impart training for apprenticeships and various initial and promotional courses.
