= Srikakulam Road railway station =

Railway station in Andhra Pradesh, India

Srikakulam Road
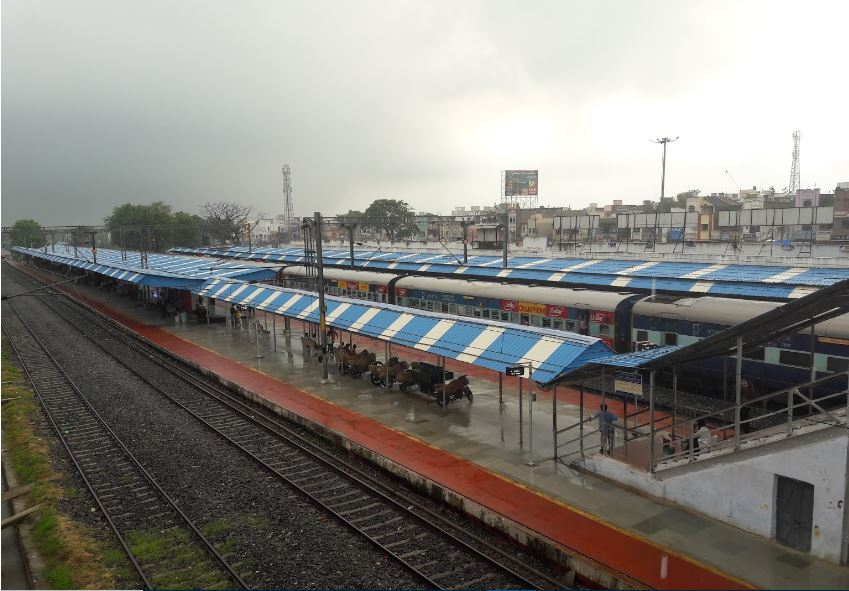
- Srikakulam Road railway station

General information
- Location: Pedestrian Overpass, Mettakkivalasa, Amadalavalasa, Srikakulam District; India
- Coordinates: 18.4085°N 83.9034°E
- System: Regional rail, Light rail & Goods railway station
- Owner: Indian Railways
- Operator: ECoR till 26th Feb 2019, SCoR From 27th Feb 2019 [But still it is operated by ECoR]
- Line: Howrah–Chennai main line
- Platforms: 4
- Tracks: 5

Construction
- Structure type: Standard (On ground)
- Parking: Available
- Cycle facilities: Available
- Accessible: Disabled access

Other information
- Status: Active
- Station code: CHE
- Zone(s): South Coast Railway
- Division(s): Visakhapatnam
- Website: http://indiarailways.gov.in

History
- Opened: 1893–1896
- Electrified: 1998–2000

Services
Preceding station	Indian Railways	Following station
Urlam towards Howrah Junction	Howrah–Chennai main line Khurda Road–Visakhapatnam section	Dusi towards Chennai Central
Location
- Location within Andhra Pradesh Location within India

Srikakulam Road railway station (station code:CHE) is an Indian Railways station in Amadalavalasa town of Andhra Pradesh. It lies on the Khurda Road–Visakhapatnam section of Howrah–Chennai main line and is administered under Visakhapatnam railway division of South Coast Railway zone.

== Structure and amenities ==
The station has four platforms and all the tracks are broad gauge and electrified. Almost all platforms are in same size. The station has two entrance terminals: one at Amadalavalasa town end other in Mettakkivalasa region equipped with reservation counters and has a bus facility to the nearby city Srikakulam and other towns. APSRTC provides, every 20 minutes, a bus facility from Srikakulam Road railway station to Srikakulam city. After creation of the new zone Srikakulam station to be first and last major station in Howrah -Chennai mainline towards north. There is a demand for a new station to be built in Srikakulam town, by local people.

== History ==
During 1893–1896, the 1,287 km (800 mi) long tracks covering the entire coastal stretch from Cuttack to Vijayawada, was built and opened to traffic by Bengal Nagpur Railway which was later renamed as South Eastern Railway.Bengal Nagpur Railway's line to Cuttack was opened on 1 January 1899. The 514 km (319 mi)-long northern portion of the East Coast line to Cuttack, including the branch line to Puri, was taken over by Bengal Nagpur Railway in 1902. The southern part was subsequently merged with Madras and Southern Mahratta Railway then with East Coast Railway zone of Indian Railways came into existence in its present form with effect from 1 April 2003. and then with South Coast Railway zone of Indian Railways came into existence in its present form with effect from 27 Feb 2019.

== Reorganization ==
The Bengal Nagpur Railway was nationalized in 1944.Eastern Railway was formed on 14 April 1952 with the portion of East Indian Railway Company east of Mughalsarai and the Bengal Nagpur Railway. In 1955, South Eastern Railway was carved out of Eastern Railway. It comprised lines mostly operated by BNR earlier. Amongst the new zones started in April 2003 were East Coast Railway, South East Central Railway. Both these railways were carved out of South Eastern Railway. South Coast Railway was carved out of East Coast Railway and South Central Railway on 27 feb 2019.

== Electrification ==
The Palasa–Tilaru, Srikakulam Road–Chiprupalle and Chirupalle–Alamanda sectors were electrified in 1998–99. The Srikakulam Road–Tilaru sector was electrified in 1999–2000.

== Classification ==
Srikakulam Road railway station is classified as an A–category station with Non suburban Group -3 category in the Waltair railway division.

== Trains which are operated from this station ==
There are Special trains in Festival times which operated by South Central railway from Srikakulam to Secunderabad, Tirupati. A MEMU train services starts from This station to Palasa and Visakhapatnam. New private train to Hyderabad (Charlapalli) starts from this station.

== See also ==
- Waltair railway division
- East Coast Railway zone
