= Visakhapatnam railway division =

Railway division of India

Visakhapatnam Railway Division
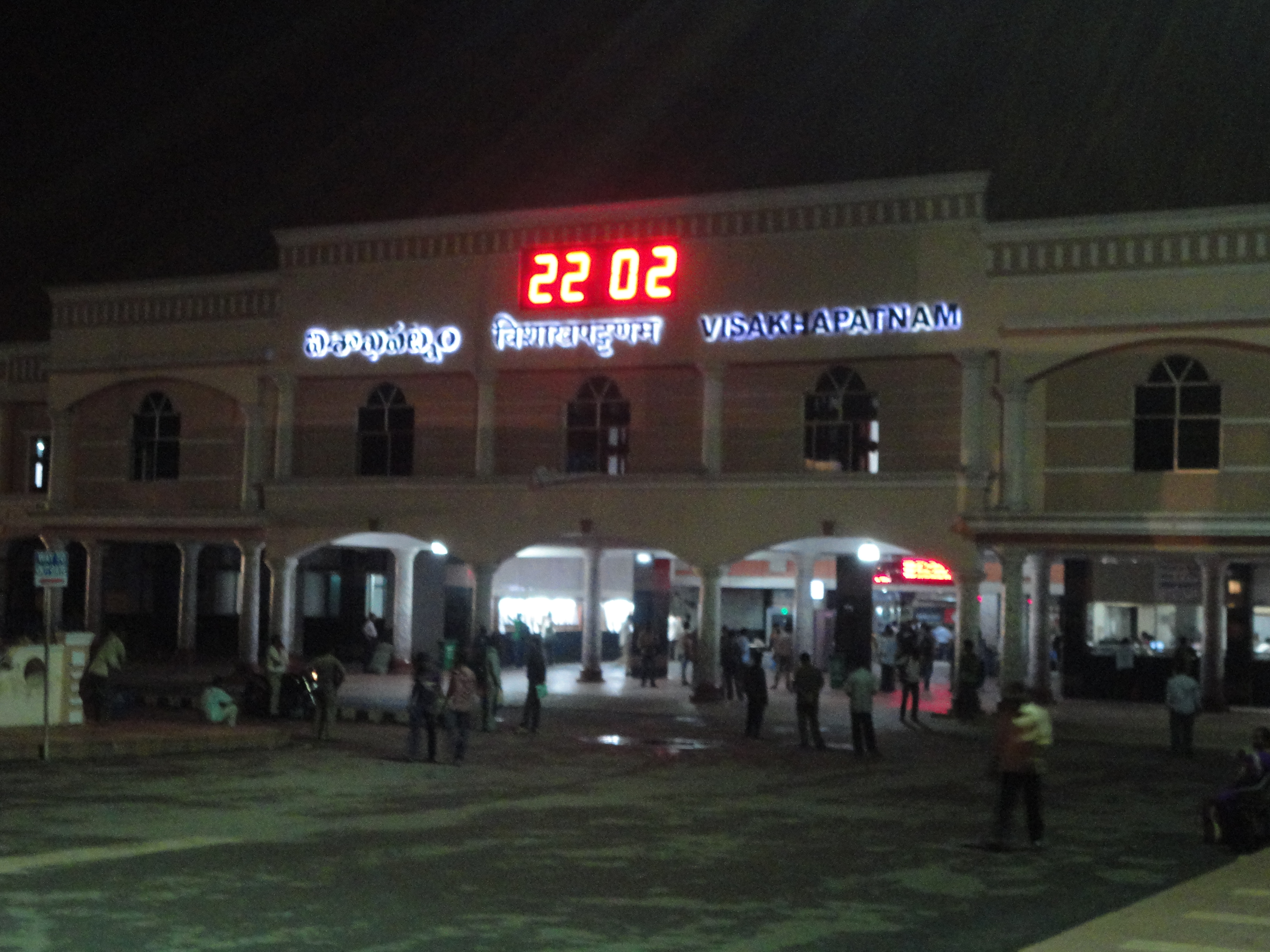
- View of Visakhapatnam railway station

Overview
- Headquarters: Visakhapatnam
- Reporting mark: VSKP
- Locale: Andhra Pradesh, India
- Dates of operation: 1893; 133 years ago–
- Predecessor: ECoR

Other
- Website: Official Website

Visakhapatnam railway division, formerly Waltair railway division is one of the four divisions of the South Coast Railway zone (SCoR) of the Indian Railways.

In 2025, Rayagada railway division was newly formed by carving out part of Waltair railway division and the truncated Waltair railway division was renamed as Visakhapatnam railway division.

== History ==
- In 1893, Waltair railway division was established.
- In 2025, the Waltair railway division was divided into two parts forming new Rayagada railway division, the truncated Waltair railway division was renamed as Visakhapatnam railway division.

== Main lines ==
The main lines of the former division were:

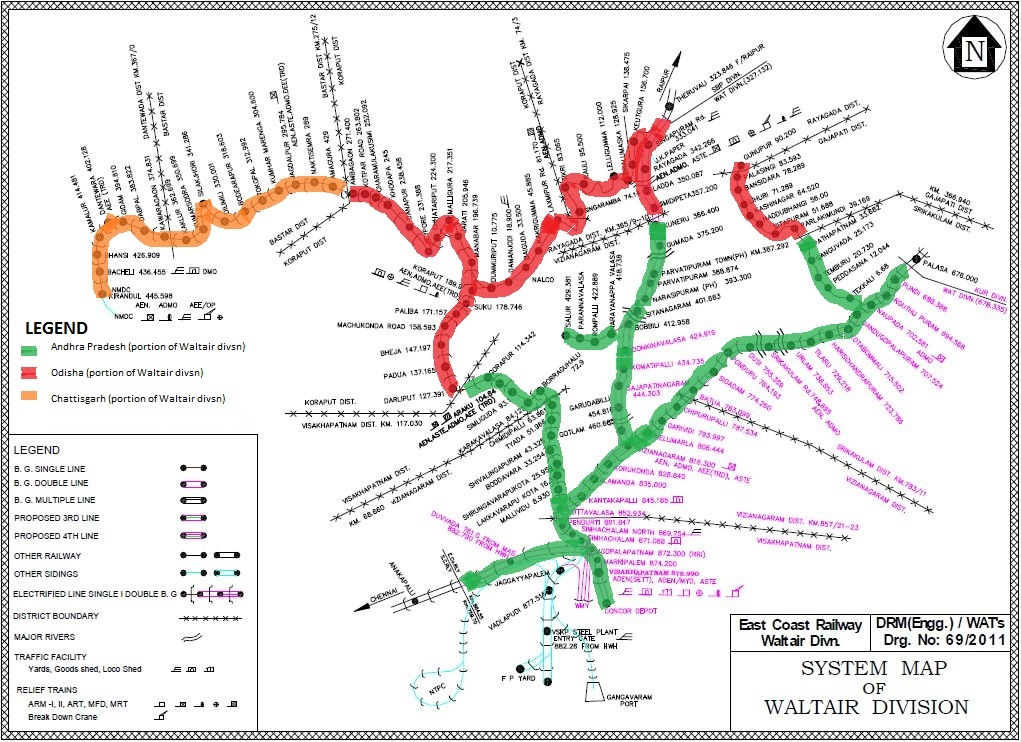
Former Waltair railway division map

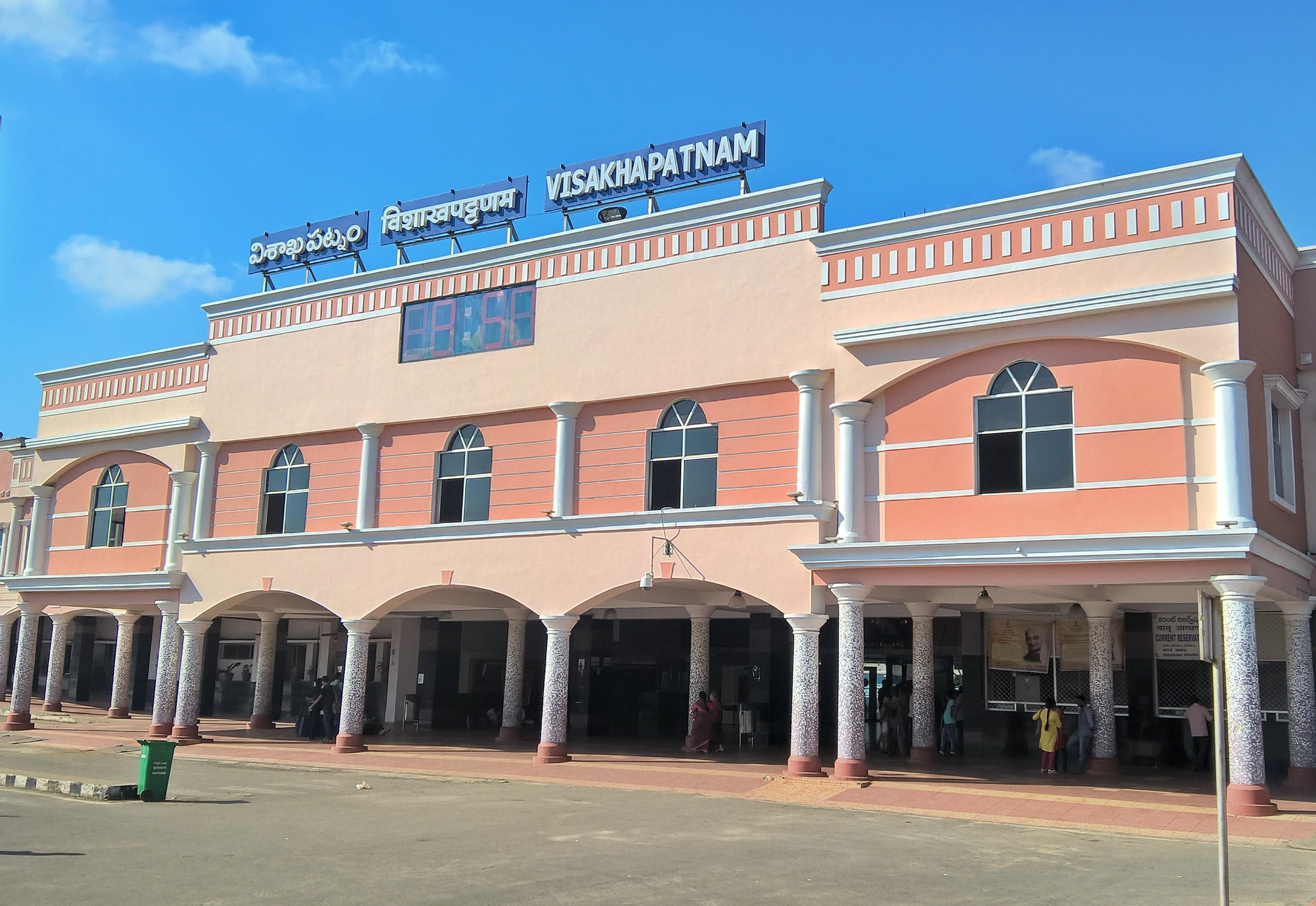
Visakhapatnam railway station

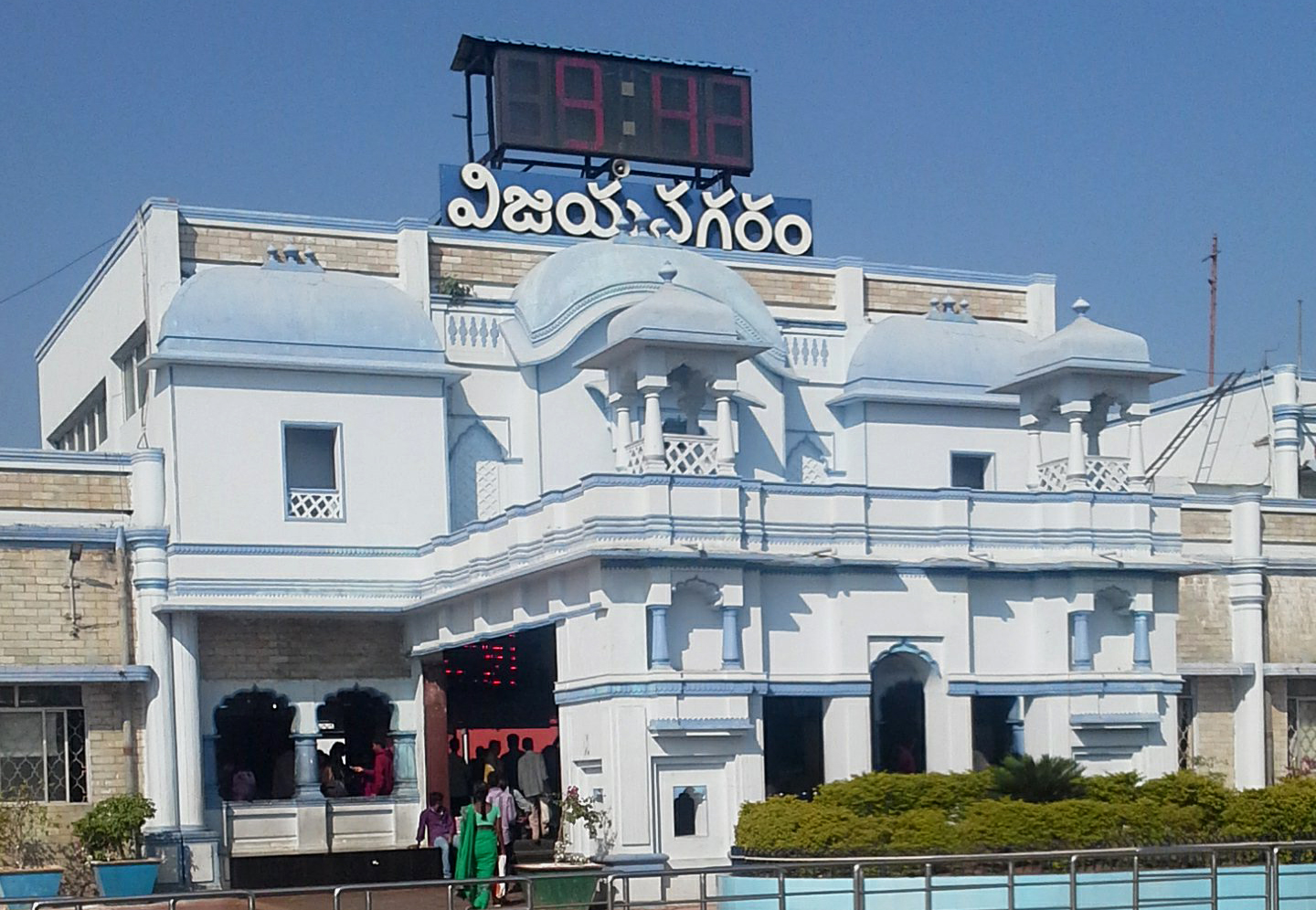
The main entrance of Vizianagaram Railway station

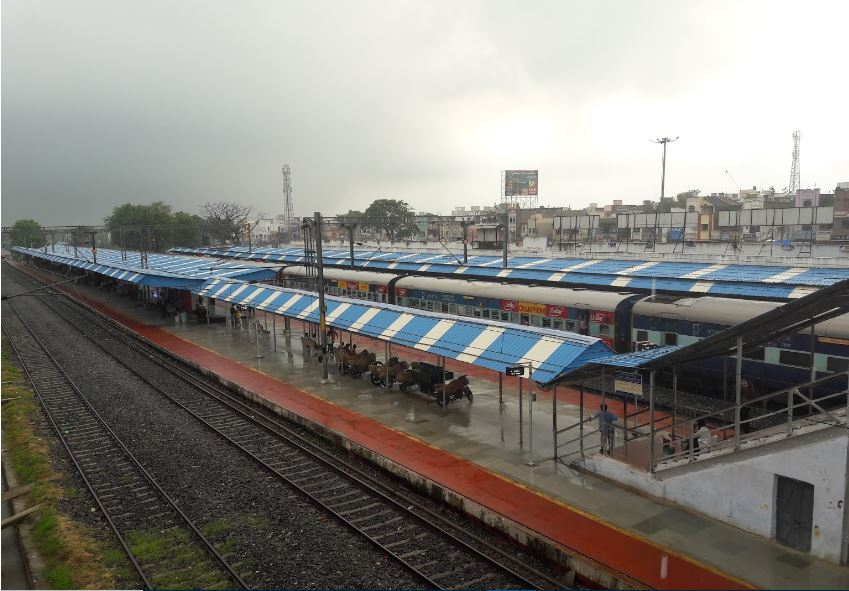
Srikakulam Road Railway Station

Section	Traction	Distance
Ichchapuram(incl.)- Palasa-Visakhapatnam - Duvvada (incl.)	Double, Triple & Quadruple Electric	270 km Route
Vizianagaram(incl.) - Kuneru(incl.)	Triple Electric	102 km Route
Simhachalam North - Duvvada bypass, Vadalapudi - Duvvada, Visakhapatnam –Jaggayapalem etc.	Double & Triple Electric	35 km Route
Bobbili – Salur		17 km Route
Naupada Jn – Paralakhemundi(excl.)	Single Electric	39 km Route
Total		463 km Route

=== Stations and categories ===
The list includes the stations that were under the former Waltair railway division and their station category.

Category of station	No. of stations	Names of stations
A-1 Category	1	Visakhapatnam Junction
A Category	3	Srikakulam Road, Vizianagaram, Palasa
B Category	-	-
C Category (Suburban station)	-	-
D Category	-	-
E Category	-	-
F Category (Halt Station)	-	-
Total	-	-

Stations closed for Passengers -

== Performance and earnings ==
Visakhapatnam railway division was awarded efficiency shields in eight categories. Vizianagaram and Tilaru were awarded best major and minor clean stations.

During the 2014–15 financial year, the division recorded its highestof ₹6,653.31 crore (US$690 million). It includes the majority share of ₹6,159.73 crore (US$640 million) from freight transport itself. The division had transported 54.86 million tonnes of load and 33.72 million passengers. The passengers earnings were ₹433.15 crore (US$45 million)

During 2012–13, freight revenue earnings of Visakhapatnam railway division (then Waltair railway division) were ₹5,642 crore (US$590 million). For the same period, the passenger traffic was 32.94 million and passenger earnings were ₹312.96 crore (US$32 million) respectively.

Due to industrialization in the modern era, the division equally serves the transportation needs of the port city of Visakhapatnam. The division served major public sectors such as Visakhapatnam Port Trust, RINL, IOC, BPCL, HPCL etc.

== Infrastructure ==
=== Loco sheds ===
The Diesel Loco Shed at Visakhapatnam, is the largest diesel shed in Indian Railways, with a capacity to accommodate 300 Diesel Locomotives. While, the Electric Loco Shed is currently holding 231 Electric locomotives.

It holds WDM-2 – 57, WDS-6 – 10, WDG-3A – 96 alongside 3 rail busses.

While, the Visakhapatnam Electric Loco Shed can accommodate 297 locomotives which includes WAG-5 – 83, WAP-4 – 21, WAP-7 - 35, WAG-6 – 9, WAG-9H –172,

== See also ==
- Vijayawada railway division
- Guntakal railway division
- Guntur railway division
