= Shalimar–Chennai Central Express =

Train in India

Shalimar - Chennai Central Express

Overview
- Service type: Express
- Status: Active
- Locale: West Bengal, Odisha, Andhra Pradesh and Tamil Nadu
- First service: 6 April 2026; 13 days ago
- Current operator: South Eastern Railway (SER)

Route
- Termini: Shalimar (SHM); MGR Chennai Central (MAS)
- Stops: 18
- Distance travelled: 1,644 km (1,022 mi)
- Average journey time: 18h 45m
- Service frequency: Weekly
- Train number: 18041 / 18042

On-board services
- Classes: General Unreserved, Sleeper Class, AC 3rd Class, AC 2nd Class (TBC)
- Seating arrangements: Yes
- Sleeping arrangements: Yes
- Catering facilities: Pantry Car
- Observation facilities: Large windows
- Baggage facilities: No
- Other facilities: Below the seats

Technical
- Rolling stock: ICF coach
- Track gauge: 1,676 mm (5 ft 6 in)
- Electrification: 25 kV 50 Hz AC Overhead line
- Operating speed: 130 km/h (81 mph) maximum, 63 km/h (39 mph) average including halts.
- Track owner: Indian Railways

The 18041 / 18042 Shalimar–Chennai Central Express is an express train belonging to South Eastern Railway zone that runs between the city Shalimar of West Bengal and Chennai Central of Tamil Nadu in India.

It operates as train number 18041 from Shalimar to Chennai Central and as train number 18042 in the reverse direction, serving the states of Tamil Nadu, Andhra Pradesh, Odisha and West Bengal.

== Services ==
• 18041/ Shalimar–Chennai Central Express has an average speed of 63 km/h and covers 1644 km in 26h 0m.

• 18042/ Chennai Central–Shalimar Express has an average speed of 49 km/h and covers 1644 km in 33h 15m.

== Route and halts ==
The Important Halts of the train are :

- Shalimar
- Santragachi Junction
- Kharagpur Junction
- Balasore
- Bhadrak
- Cuttack Junction
- Bhubaneswar
- Khurda Road Junction
- Brahmapur
- Vizianagaram Junction
- Simhachalam
- Duvvada
- Samalkot Junction
- Rajahmundry
- Vijayawada Junction
- Ongole
- Nellore
- MGR Chennai Central

== Schedule ==
• 18041 - 2:45 PM (Monday) [Shalimar]

• 18042 - 6:45 PM (Tuesday) [MGR Chennai Central]

== Coach composition ==
1. General Unreserved - 4
2. Sleeper Class - 8
3. AC 3rd Class - 3
4. AC 2nd Class - 1

== Traction ==
As the entire route is fully electrified it is hauled by a Howrah Shed-based WAP-7 electric locomotive from Shalimar to Chennai Central and vice versa.

== Rake reversal or rake share ==
No rake Reversal or rake share.

== See also ==
Trains from Shalimar :

1. Shalimar–Secunderabad AC Superfast Express
2. Samarsata Express
3. Shalimar–Udaipur City Weekly Express
4. Thiruvananthpuram–Shalimar Express
5. Shalimar–Porbandar Superfast Express

Trains from Chennai Central :

1. Chennai Rajdhani Express
2. Bengaluru City–Chennai Central Shatabdi Express
3. Chennai Central–Ahmedabad Humsafar Express
4. MGR Chennai Central–Mysuru Vande Bharat Express
5. Chennai–Hazrat Nizamuddin Duronto Express

== Notes ==
a. Runs one day in a week with both directions
