= Santragachi–Ajmer Weekly Express =

Train in India

Overview
- Service type: Express
- First service: 29 July 2012; 13 years ago
- Current operator: South Eastern Railway

Route
- Termini: Santragachi (SRC); Ajmer Junction (AII)
- Stops: 19
- Distance travelled: 1,986 km (1,234 mi)
- Average journey time: 39 Hrs 55 Mins
- Service frequency: Weekly
- Train number: 18009 / 18010

On-board services
- Classes: AC 2 tier, AC 3 tier, Sleeper class, General Unreserved
- Seating arrangements: Yes
- Sleeping arrangements: Yes
- Catering facilities: On-board catering, E-catering
- Observation facilities: Large windows
- Baggage facilities: No
- Other facilities: Below the seats

Technical
- Rolling stock: LHB Coaches
- Track gauge: 1,676 mm (5 ft 6 in)
- Operating speed: 50 km/h (31 mph) average including halts.

The 18009 / 18010 Santragachi–Ajmer Weekly Express is an Express train belonging to South Eastern Railway zone that runs between Santragachi Junction and Ajmer Junction in India. It is currently being operated with 18009/18010 train numbers on a weekly basis.

== Service ==
- 18009 Santragachi–Ajmer Weekly Express has an average speed of 50 km/h and covers 1986 km in 39h 55m.
- 18010 Ajmer–Santragachi Weekly Express has an average speed of 51 km/h and covers 1986 km in 39h 00m.

== Route and halts ==
- Santragachi Junction
- Kharagpur Junction
- Tatanagar Junction
- Barkakana Junction
- Barwadih Junction
- Daltonganj
- Chopan
- Singrauli
- Katni Murwara Junction
- Saugor
- Guna Junction
- Kota Junction
- Chanderiya
- Bhilwara
- Ajmer Junction

== Coach composition ==
The train has Modern LHB rakes with a maximum speed of 130 km/h. The train consists of 22 coaches:

- 2 AC II Tier
- 6 AC III Tier
- 10 Sleeper Coaches
- 2 General Unreserved
- 2 End on Generation (EOG) Coaches

== Traction ==
Both trains are hauled by a Santragachi-based WAP-4 locomotive from end to end.

== Rake sharing ==
The train shares its rake with,

- 22829/22830 Shalimar–Bhuj Weekly Superfast Express
- 22825/22826 Shalimar–Chennai Central Weekly SF Express
- 22851/22852 Santragachi–Mangalore Central Vivek Express.

== Direction reversal ==
The train reverses its direction 3 times at:

- Chopan
- Kota Junction
- Chanderiya.

== See also ==
- Ajmer Junction railway station
- Santragachi Junction railway station
- Shalimar–Chennai Central Weekly SF Express
- Shalimar–Bhuj Weekly Superfast Express
- Santragachi–Mangalore Central Vivek Express
