= Shalimar–Chennai Central Weekly Superfast Express =

Train in India

Overview
- Service type: Superfast
- First service: 24 July 2012; 14 years ago
- Current operator: South Eastern Railway

Route
- Termini: Shalimar (SHM); Chennai Central (MAS)
- Stops: 20
- Distance travelled: 1,659 km (1,031 mi)
- Average journey time: 25hrs 50mins
- Service frequency: Weekly (Note: Runs one day in a week for every direction.)
- Train number: 22825 / 22826

On-board services
- Classes: AC 2 tier, AC 3 tier, Sleeper class, General Unreserved
- Seating arrangements: Yes
- Sleeping arrangements: Yes
- Catering facilities: On-board catering, E-catering
- Observation facilities: Large windows
- Baggage facilities: Available
- Other facilities: Below the seats

Technical
- Rolling stock: LHB coach
- Track gauge: 1,676 mm (5 ft 6 in)
- Operating speed: 64 km/h (40 mph) average including halts.

The 22825 / 22826 Shalimar–Chennai Central Weekly Superfast Express is an Superfast train belonging to South Eastern Railway zone that runs between Shalimar and Chennai Central in India. It is currently being operated with 22825/22826 train numbers on a weekly basis.

== Service ==
The 22825/Shalimar–Chennai Central Weekly Superfast Express has an average speed of 64 km/h and covers 1659 km in 25h 50m. The 22826/Chennai Central–Shalimar Weekly Superfast Express has an average speed of 59 km/h and covers 1659 km in 28h 00m.

== Route and halts ==
The important halts of the train are:

- Shalimar
- Santragachi Junction
- Kharagpur Junction
- Cuttack Junction
- Bhubaneswar
- Khurda Road Junction
- Brahmapur
- Vizianagaram Junction
- Visakhapatnam Junction
- Eluru
- Vijayawada
- Ongole
- Chennai Central

== Coach composition ==
The train has Modern LHB rakes with a maximum speed of 130 km/h. The train consists of 19 coaches:

- 2 AC II Tier
- 4 AC III Tier
- 9 Sleeper coaches
- 2 General Unreserved
- 2 End on Generation (EOG) Coaches

== Traction ==
Both trains are hauled by a Santragachi Loco Shed-based WAP-7 electric locomotive from Shalimar to Visakhapatnam. From Visakhapatnam, trains are hauled by a Lallaguda Loco Shed-based WAP-7 electric locomotive up to Chennai and vice versa.

== Rake sharing ==
The train shares its rake with;

- 22829/22830 Shalimar–Bhuj Weekly Superfast Express
- 18009/18010 Santragachi–Ajmer Weekly Express
- 22851/22852 Santragachi–Mangalore Central Vivek Express.

== Direction reversal ==
The train reverses its direction once:

- Visakhapatnam Junction

== See also ==
- Shalimar railway station
- Chennai Central railway station
- Santragachi–Ajmer Weekly Express
- Shalimar–Bhuj Weekly Superfast Express
- Santragachi–Mangalore Central Vivek Express
