= Shalimar–Bhuj Weekly Superfast Express =

Train in India

Overview
- Service type: Superfast Express
- Locale: West Bengal, Jharkhand, Odisha, Chhattisgarh, Madhya Pradesh & Gujarat
- First service: 20 April 2013; 13 years ago
- Current operator: South Eastern Railway

Route
- Termini: Shalimar (SHM); Bhuj (BHUJ)
- Stops: 30
- Distance travelled: 2,419 km (1,503 mi)
- Average journey time: 42 hrs 40 mins
- Service frequency: Weekly
- Train number: 22829 / 22830

On-board services
- Classes: AC 2 Tier, AC 3 Tier, Sleeper class, General Unreserved
- Seating arrangements: Yes
- Sleeping arrangements: Yes
- Catering facilities: E-catering; On-board catering
- Observation facilities: Large windows
- Baggage facilities: Available
- Other facilities: Below the seats

Technical
- Rolling stock: LHB Coach
- Track gauge: Broad Gauge
- Operating speed: 57 km/h (35 mph) average with halts.
Route map
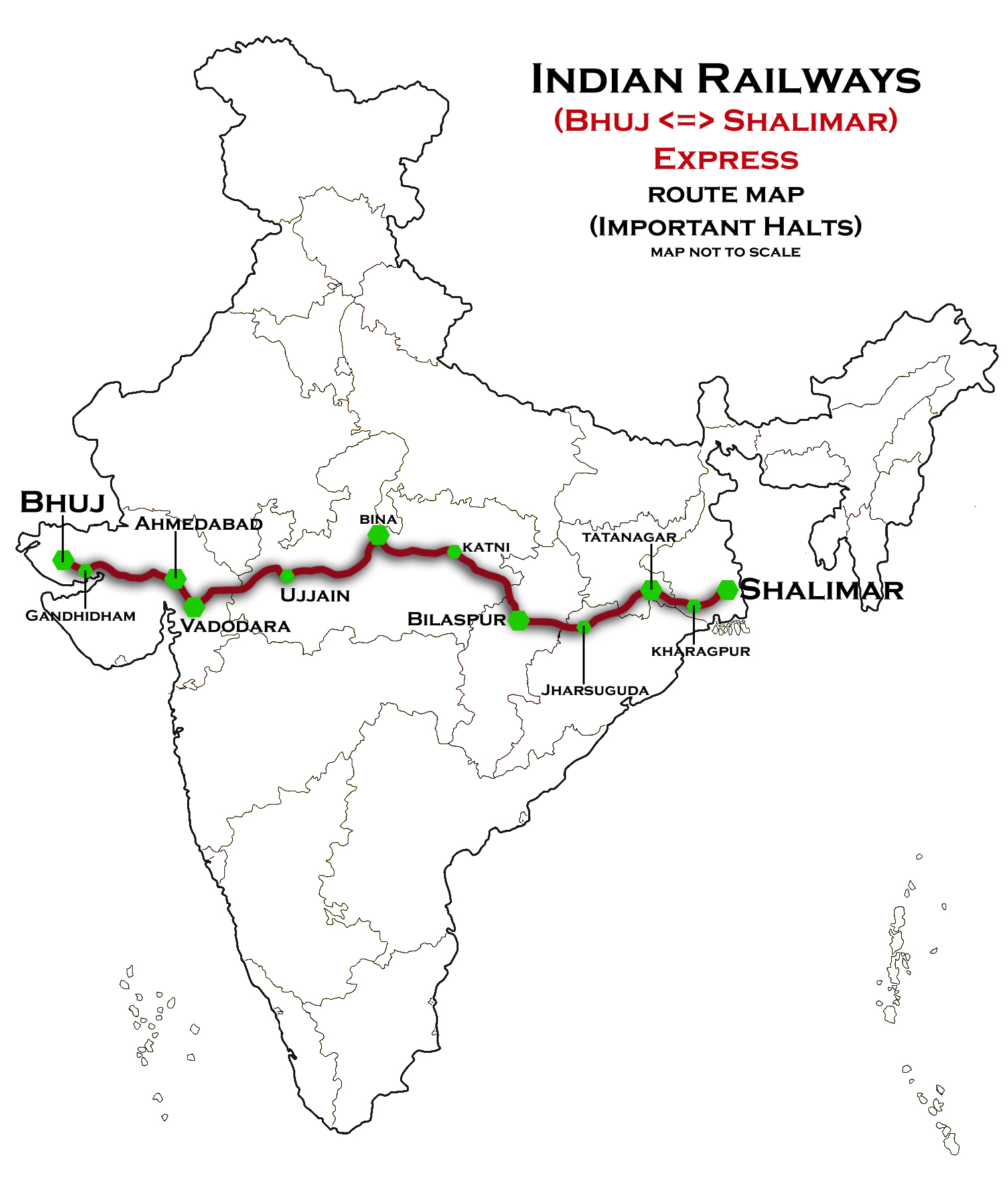

The 22829 / 22830 Shalimar–Bhuj Weekly Superfast Express is a Superfast Express train belonging to South Eastern Railway zone that runs between Shalimar of Kolkata and Bhuj of Kutch in India. It is currently being operated with 22829/22830 train numbers on a weekly basis.

== Coach composition ==
The train has Modern LHB rakes with max speed of 130 kmph. The train consists of 22 coaches:

- 2 AC II Tier
- 6 AC III Tier
- 10 Sleeper Coaches
- 2 General Unreserved
- 2 End on Generation (EOG) Coaches

== Service ==
22829/ Bhuj–Shalimar Weekly Superfast Express has an average speed of 57 km/h and covers 2419 km in 42 hrs 25 mins.

22830/ Shalimar–Bhuj Weekly Superfast Express has an average speed of 57 km/h and covers 2419 km in 42 hrs 25 mins.

== Route & halts ==
The important halts of the train are:

- Shalimar
- Santragachi Junction
- Kharagpur Junction
- Tatanagar Junction
- Chakradharpur
- Rourkela Junction
- Jharsuguda Junction
- Raigarh
- Champa Junction
- Bilaspur Junction
- Anuppur Junction
- Shahdol
- Katni Murwara
- Damoh
- Saugor
- Bina Junction
- Vidisha
- Sant Hirdaram Nagar
- Shujalpur
- Ujjain Junction
- Nagda Junction
- Ratlam Junction
- Vadodara Junction
- Anand Junction
- Ahmedabad Junction
- Dhrangadhra Junction
- Samakhiali Junction
- Bhachau
- Gandhidham Junction
- Adipur Junction
- Bhuj

== Schedule ==
Train number	Station code	Departure station	Departure time	Departure day	Arrival station	Arrival time	Arrival day
22829	BHUJ	Bhuj	15:05 PM	Tue	Shalimar	10:00 AM	Thu
22830	SHM	Shalimar	20:20 PM	Sat	Bhuj	16:30 PM	Mon

== Direction reversal ==
Train reverses its direction one times at :

- Gandhidham Junction

== Rake sharing ==
The train shares its rake with;

- 22825/22826 Shalimar–Chennai Central Weekly Superfast Express
- 18009/18010 Santragachi–Ajmer Weekly Express
- 22851/22852 Santragachi–Mangalore Central Vivek Express.

== Traction ==
Both trains are hauled by a Santragachi Loco Shed-based WAP-7 electric locomotive from Shalimar to Bhuj and vice versa.
