= Gurudev Express =

Train in India

Gurudev Superfast Express
Overview
- Service type: Superfast Express
- First service: 1 July 2001; 25 years ago
- Current operator: Southern Railway

Route
- Termini: Nagercoil (NCJ); Kolkata Shalimar (SHM)
- Stops: 41
- Distance travelled: 2,585 km (1,606 mi)
- Average journey time: 44 hours 45 minutes
- Service frequency: Weekly
- Train number: 12659 / 12660

On-board services
- Classes: AC 2 Tier, AC 3 Tier, Sleeper Class, General Unreserved
- Seating arrangements: Yes
- Sleeping arrangements: Yes
- Catering facilities: On-board catering, E-catering
- Observation facilities: Large windows
- Baggage facilities: No
- Other facilities: Below the seats

Technical
- Rolling stock: LHB coach
- Track gauge: 1,676 mm (5 ft 6 in)
- Operating speed: 57.76 km/h (36 mph) average including halts.
Route map
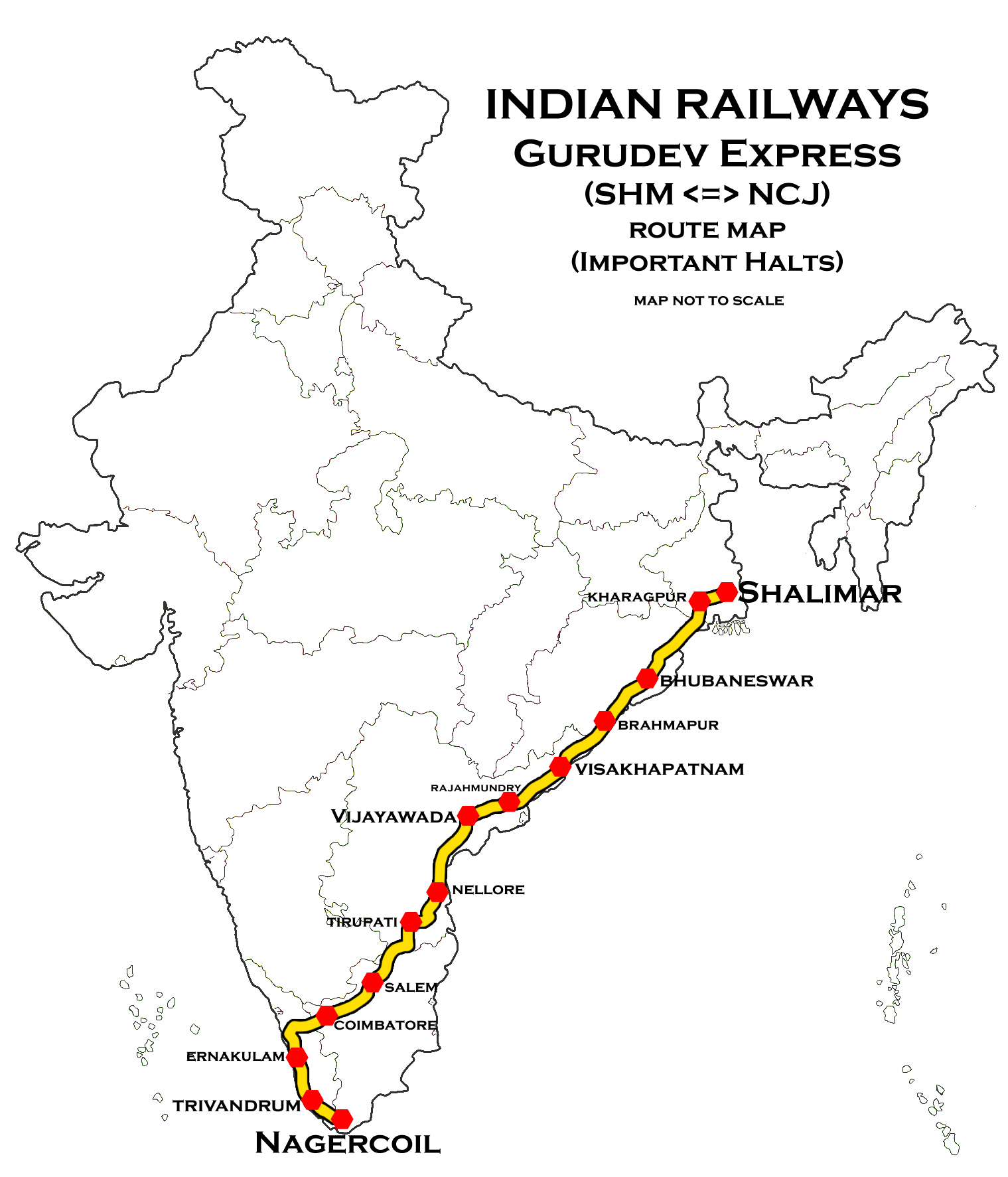

The 12659 / 12660 Gurudev Superfast Express is a Superfast express train belonging to the Indian Railways southern zone that runs between Nagercoil Junction and Shalimar in India.

It operates as train number 12659 from Nagercoil Junction to Shalimar and as train number 12660 in the reverse direction serving the states of Tamil Nadu, Kerala, Andhra Pradesh, Odisha, and West Bengal.

== Background ==
The Gurudev Express is a joint tribute to Rabindranath Tagore and saint Sree Narayana Guru. during introduction in 2001, it was numbered 6357/6358 with a different timetable, covering 2,585 km (1,606 mi) in 46 hours 15 mins at speed of 56 km/h (35 mph)

== Coaches ==
The 12659 / 60 Gurudev Express has one AC 2-tier, two AC 3-tier, 13 sleeper class, three general unreserved and two SLR (seating with luggage rake) coaches and two high capacity parcel van coaches. It does not carry a pantry car coach.

As is customary with most train services in India, coach composition may be amended at the discretion of Indian Railways depending on demand.

== Current Service ==
The 12659 Nagercoil Junction - Shalimar Gurudev Express covers the distance of 2,585 km (1,606 mi) in 44 hours 30 mins at 58.075 km/h (36 mph) speed and in 45 hours 00 mins as the 12660 Shalimar - Nagercoil Junction at 57 km/h (35 mph) speed.

As the average speed of the train is above 55 km/h (34 mph), as per railway rules, its fare includes a Superfast surcharge.

== Routing ==
The 12659 / 60 runs from Nagercoil Junction via Thiruvananthapuram, Kollam Junction, Kayankulam Junction, Tiruvalla, Kottayam, Ernakulam Town, Thrissur, Palakkad Junction, Coimbatore Junction, Erode Junction, Salem Junction, Jolarpettai Junction, Katpadi Junction, Tirupati, Renigunta Junction, Gudur Junction, Nellore, Ongole, Vijayawada Junction, Eluru, Rajahmundry, Samalkot Junction, Visakhapatnam, Vizianagaram Junction, Brahmapur, Khurda Road Junction, Bhubaneswar, Cuttack Junction, Bhadrak, Balasore, Kharagpur Junction, Santragachi Junction to Shalimar.

== Direction Reversal ==
The train reverses its direction once at;

- Visakhapatnam.

== Traction ==
As the route is fully electrified, an Erode Loco Shed based WAP-7 electric locomotive powers the train up to Visakhapatnam. Later, a Santragachi Loco Shed based WAP-7 electric locomotive takes the reversed direction and pulls the train to its destination.

== Rake composition ==
- 1 AC II Tier
- 2 AC III Tier
- 12 Sleeper Coaches
- 3 General
- 2 moter Cum Parcel van
- 2 General can luggage

Loco	1	2	3	4	5	6	7	8	9	10	11	12	13	14	15	16	17	18	19	20	21	22
	VP	GRD	VP	GEN	S1	S2	S3	S4	S5	S6	S7	S8	S9	S10	S11	S12	B1	B2	A1	GEN	GEN	GRD
