= Shalimar rail yard =

Rail Yard in West Bengal, India

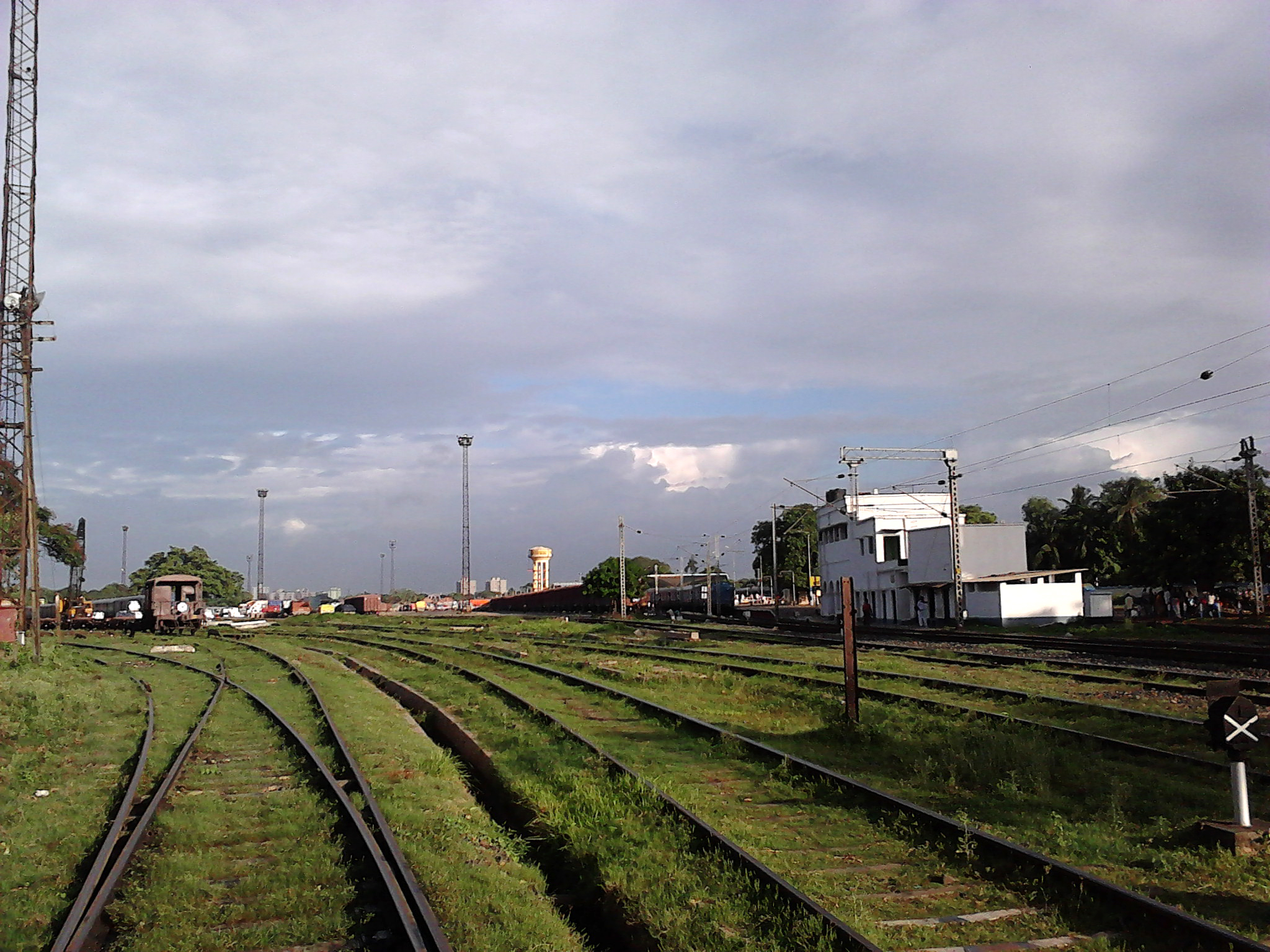
The Shalimar Railway Rail Yard, Howrah.

Shalimar rail yard served as a terminus for goods trains and hosted a rail yard since its inception in 1883. In recent years, it has been brought into the network of passenger train stations, developing into Shalimar Station, to reduce pressure on Howrah Station. Apart from suburban trains, few long-distance trains have been introduced or moved over here (from Howrah station). It is under Kharagpur railway division. Shalimar still serves as an important transshipment point in Kolkata. Shalimar also has port side domestic container terminals. An additional container terminal is also proposed there.

== See also ==
- Shalimar Station
