= Samarsata Express =

Train in India

Samarsata Superfast Express

Overview
- Service type: Superfast Express
- First service: 17 August 1998; 27 years ago
- Current operator: Central Railway

Route
- Termini: Mumbai LTT (LTT); Shalimar (SHM)
- Stops: 21
- Distance travelled: 2,071 km (1,287 mi)
- Average journey time: 35 hours 10 minutes
- Service frequency: Bi-weekly.
- Train number: 12151 / 12152

On-board services
- Classes: AC First Class, AC 2 Tier, AC 3 Tier, Sleeper Class, General Unreserved
- Seating arrangements: Yes
- Sleeping arrangements: Yes
- Catering facilities: Available
- Observation facilities: Large windows
- Baggage facilities: Available
- Other facilities: Below the seats

Technical
- Rolling stock: LHB coach
- Track gauge: 1,676 mm (5 ft 6 in); Broad Gauge
- Operating speed: 60 km/h (37 mph) average including halts.
- Rake sharing: Rake sharing with 12101/12102 Jnaneswari Express
Route map
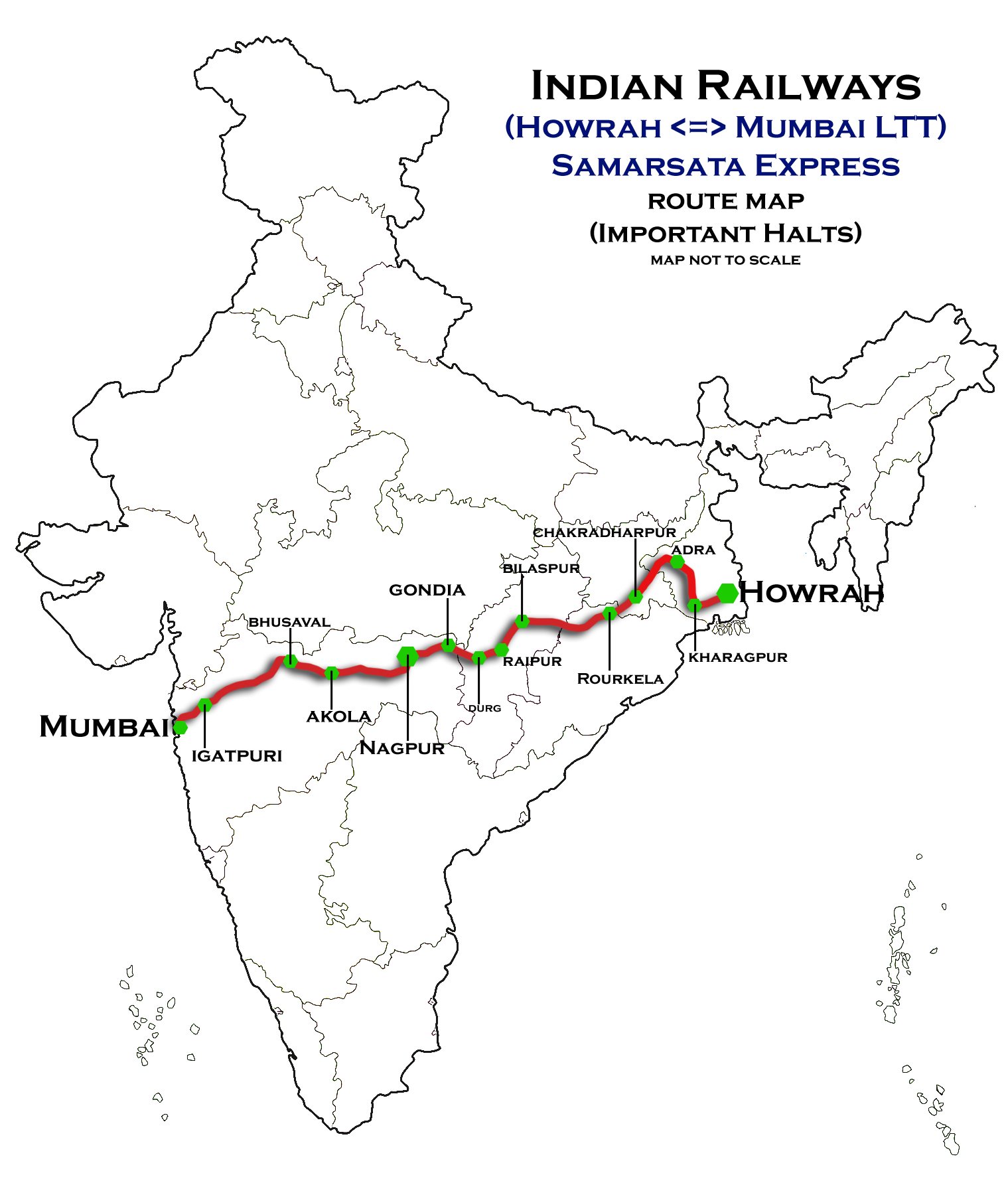

The 12151 / 12152 Samarsata Superfast Express is a superfast express train belonging to Indian Railways – Central Railways zone that runs between Lokmanya Tilak Terminus and Shalimar in India. It is named after Samarasta Festival held in Nagpur.

It operates as train number 12151 from Lokmanya Tilak Terminus to Shalimar and as train number 12152 in the reverse direction, serving the states of Maharashtra, Chhattisgarh, Odisha, Jharkhand & West Bengal.

== Coaches ==
The 12151 / 12152 Lokmanya Tilak Terminus–Howrah Samarsata Express presently has 1 AC 1st Class, 2 AC 2 tier, 5 AC 3 tier, 8 Sleeper Class, 3 Second Class seating & 2 SLR (Seating cum Luggage Rake) coaches. In addition, it carries a pantry car.

As with most train services in India, coach composition may be amended at the discretion of Indian Railways depending on demand.

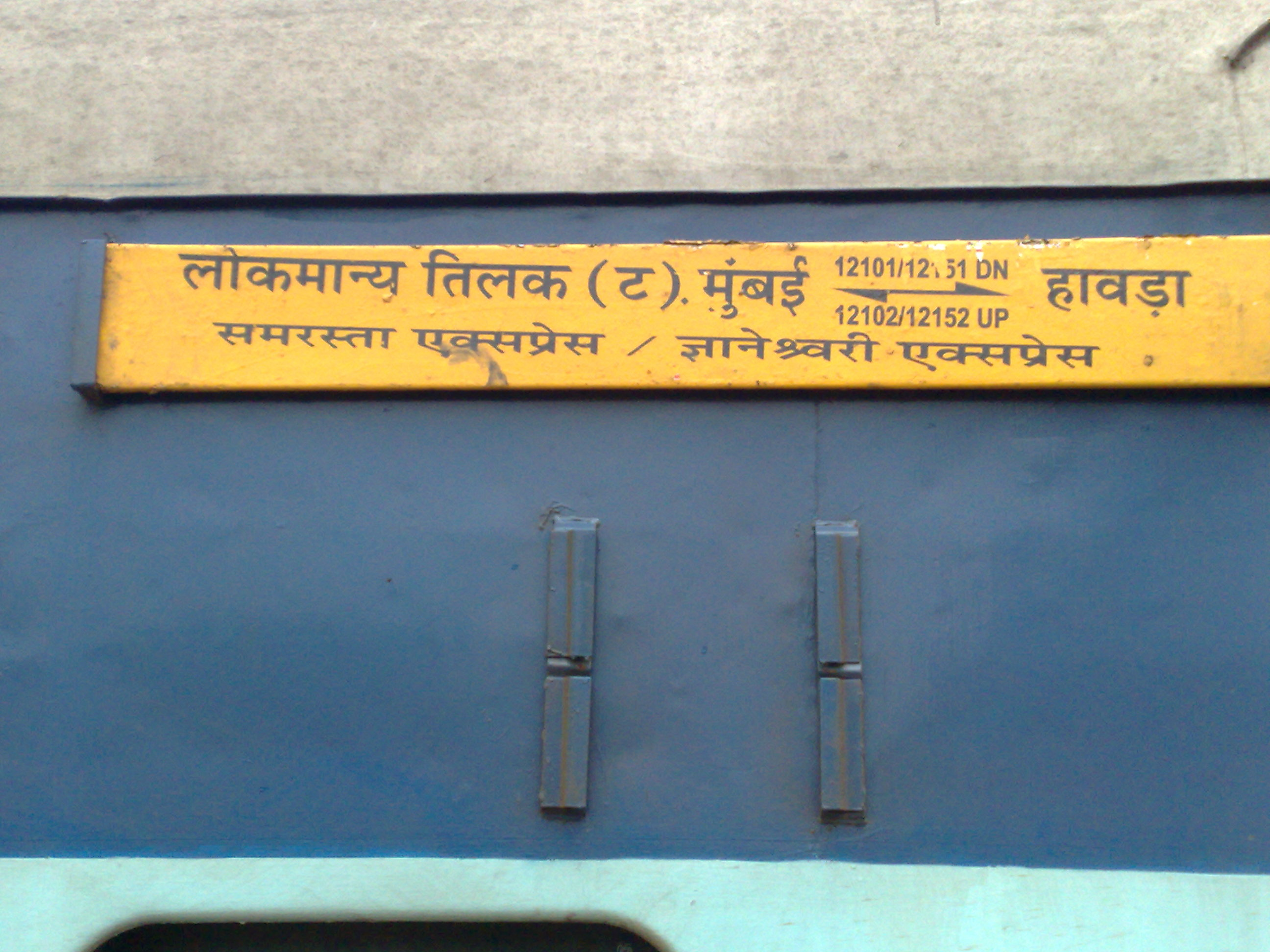
Samarsata Express – coachboard

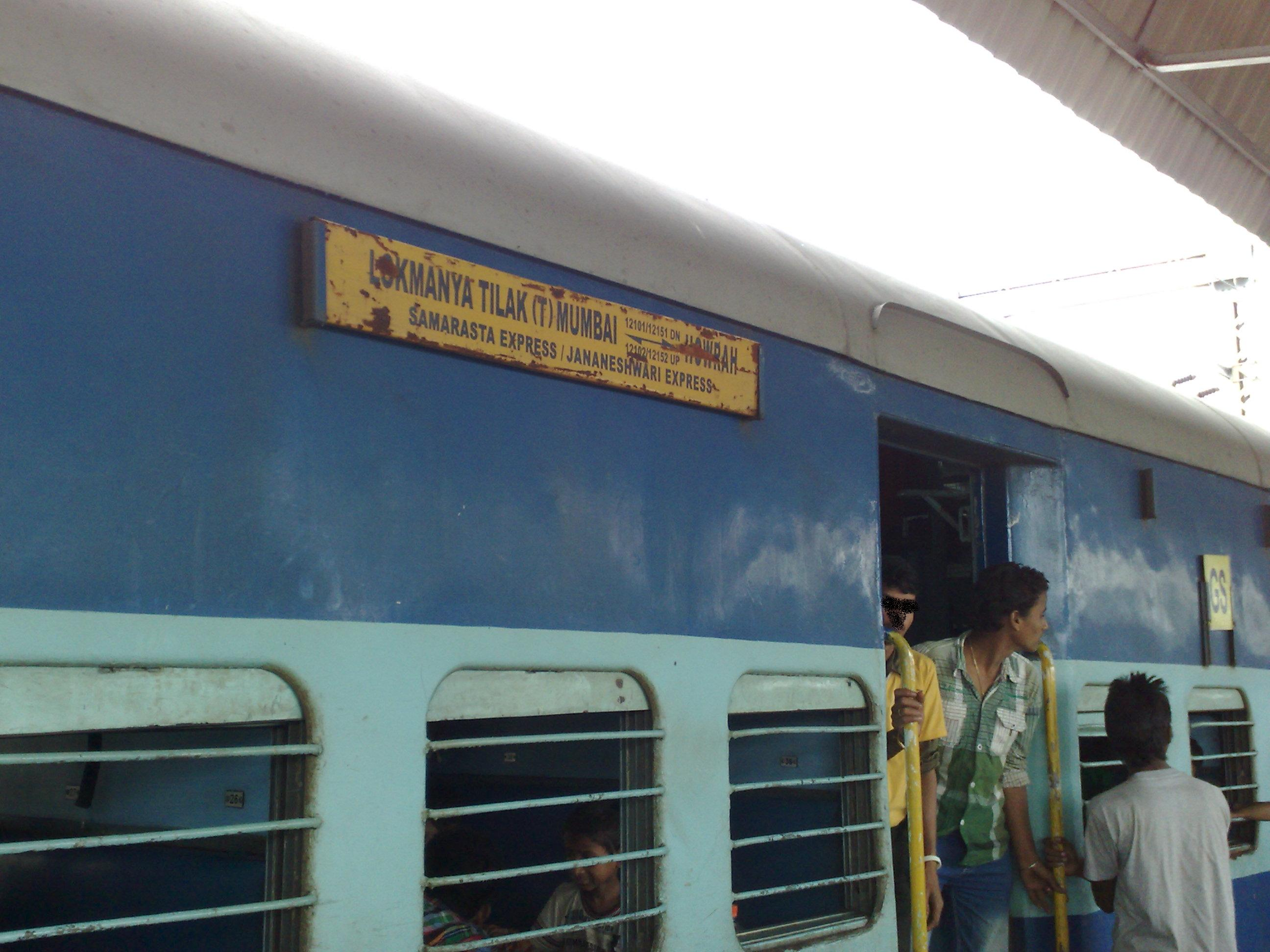
Samarsata Express – 2nd Class coach

== Service ==
The 12151 / 12152 Samarsata Express covers the distance of 2081 kilometres in 35 hours 50 mins as 12151 Lokmanya Tilak Terminus–Howrah Samarsata Express (58.07 km/h) and 2091 kilometres in 34 hrs 15 mins as 12152 Howrah–Lokmanya Tilak Terminus Samarsata Express (61.05 km/h).

As the average speed of the train is above 55 km/h, as per Indian Railways rules, its fare includes a superfast surcharge.

== Routeing ==
The 12151 / 12152 Samarsata Express runs from Lokmanya Tilak Terminus via Kalyan Junction, Igatpuri, Nashik Road, Bhusaval Junction, Akola Junction, Nagpur Junction, Gondia Junction, Bilaspur Junction, Rourkela Junction, Chakradharpur, Chandil Junction, Adra Junction, Bankura Junction, Kharagpur Junction to Shalimar.

== Traction ==
Initially a WCAM-3 from the Kalyan shed would haul the train from Lokmanya Tilak Terminus up to Igatpuri handing over to a Santragachi-based WAP-4 which powers the train until Howrah Junction.

With Central Railway progressively moving towards a complete changeover from DC to AC traction, it has recently started being hauled end to end by a Kalyan Loco Shed or Ajni Loco Shed-based WAP-7 electric locomotive.

== Timings ==
- 12151 Lokmanya Tilak Terminus–Shalimar Samarsata Express leaves Lokmanya Tilak Terminus every Wednesday & Thursday at 20:35 hrs IST and reaches Shalimar at 06:55 hrs IST on the 3rd day.
- 12152 Shalimar–Lokmanya Tilak Terminus Samarsata Express leaves Shalimar every Friday & Saturday at 19:45 hrs IST and reaches Lokmanya Tilak Terminus at 05:30 hrs IST on the 3rd day.
