= Kolkata Shalimar–Patna AC Duronto Express =

Train in India

Kolkata Shalimar - Patna Jn AC Duronto Express
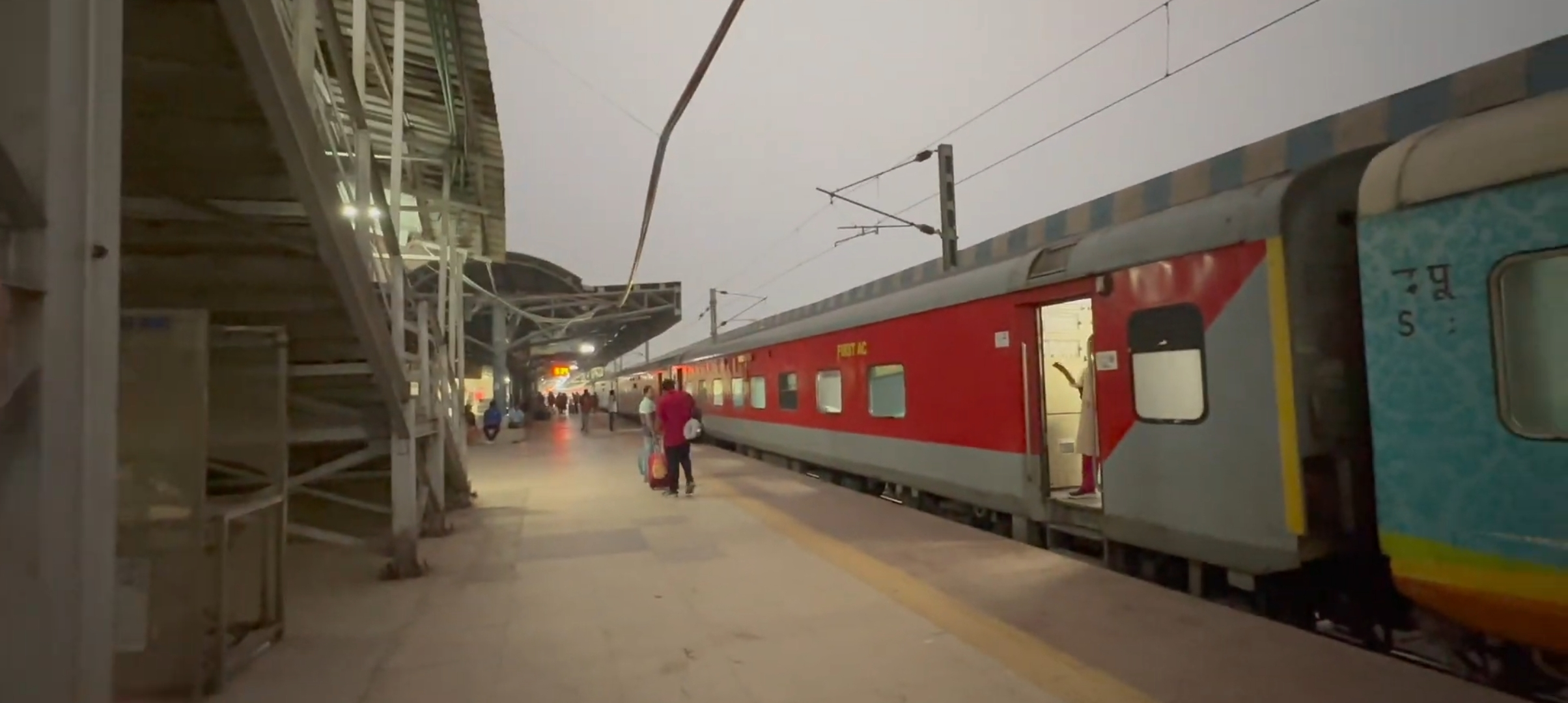
- The rake of the train arrived at Shalimar Station

Overview
- Service type: Duronto Express
- Locale: West Bengal, Jharkhand, Bihar
- First service: 19 February 2012
- Current operator: South Eastern Railway

Route
- Termini: Shalimar; Patna Junction
- Stops: 2
- Distance travelled: 536 km (333 mi)
- Average journey time: 8 hours 35 minutes
- Service frequency: Tri-Weekly Service
- Train number: 22213 / 22214

On-board services
- Classes: AC 1st Class, AC 2 tier, AC 3 tier
- Seating arrangements: No
- Sleeping arrangements: Yes
- Catering facilities: No
- Observation facilities: Large windows

Technical
- Rolling stock: LHB coach
- Track gauge: 1,676 mm (5 ft 6 in)
- Operating speed: 130 km/h (81 mph) Top Operating Speed,62 km/h (39 mph) average speed

The Kolkata Shalimar-Patna AC Duronto Express is a premium superfast express train of the Indian Railways connecting Shalimar Railway Station (SHM) to Patna Railway Station (PNBE). It is currently being operated with 22213 (M, W, F)/ 22214 (T, T, Sat) train numbers.

== Route & halts ==
The stations and the stoppage time and platform no. are as follows-

Check Train Timings Before Boarding

- Arrival Starts
  Shalimar
  (Starts)
  Departure 09:55 PM
  0 Km Platform 1
- Arrival 12:57 AM
  Asansol Junction
  (5 minutes)
  Departure 01:02 AM
  207 Km Platform 4
- Arrival 02:12 AM
  Jasidih Junction
  (2 minutes)
  Departure 02:14 AM
  317 Km Platform 2
- Arrival 06:15 AM
  Patna Junction
  (Ends)
  Departure Ends
  538 Km Platform 3
- Arrival Starts
  Patna Junction
  (Starts)
  Departure 08:45 PM
  0 Km Platform 2
- Arrival 12:07 AM
  Jasidih Junction
  (2 minutes)
  Departure 12:09 AM
  220 Km Platform 1
- Arrival 01:43 AM
  Asansol Junction
  (5 minutes)
  Departure 01:48 PM
  331 Km Platform 4
- Arrival 05:45 PM
  Shalimar
  (Ends)
  Departure Ends
  535 Km Platform 1

== Engine used ==
The Engine used for this Train is a WAP 7 of Santragachi shed from Shalimar to Patna.

== Coach composition ==
The Duronto train provides a different category of accommodation. It has 1 AC tier, 2 AC tier and 3 AC tiers. The coach composition of the Patna Duronto is as follows:

| Loco | 1 | 2 | 3 | 4 | 5 | 6 | 7 | 8 | 9 | 10 | 11 | 12 | 13 | 14 |
|---|---|---|---|---|---|---|---|---|---|---|---|---|---|---|
| | SLR | B1 | B2 | B3 | B4 | B5 | B6 | B7 | B8 | B9 | B10 | A1 | H1 | EOG |

== See also ==
- Duronto Express
