= Thiruvananthpuram–Shalimar Express =

Indian express train

Thiruvananthapuram–Shalimar Superfast
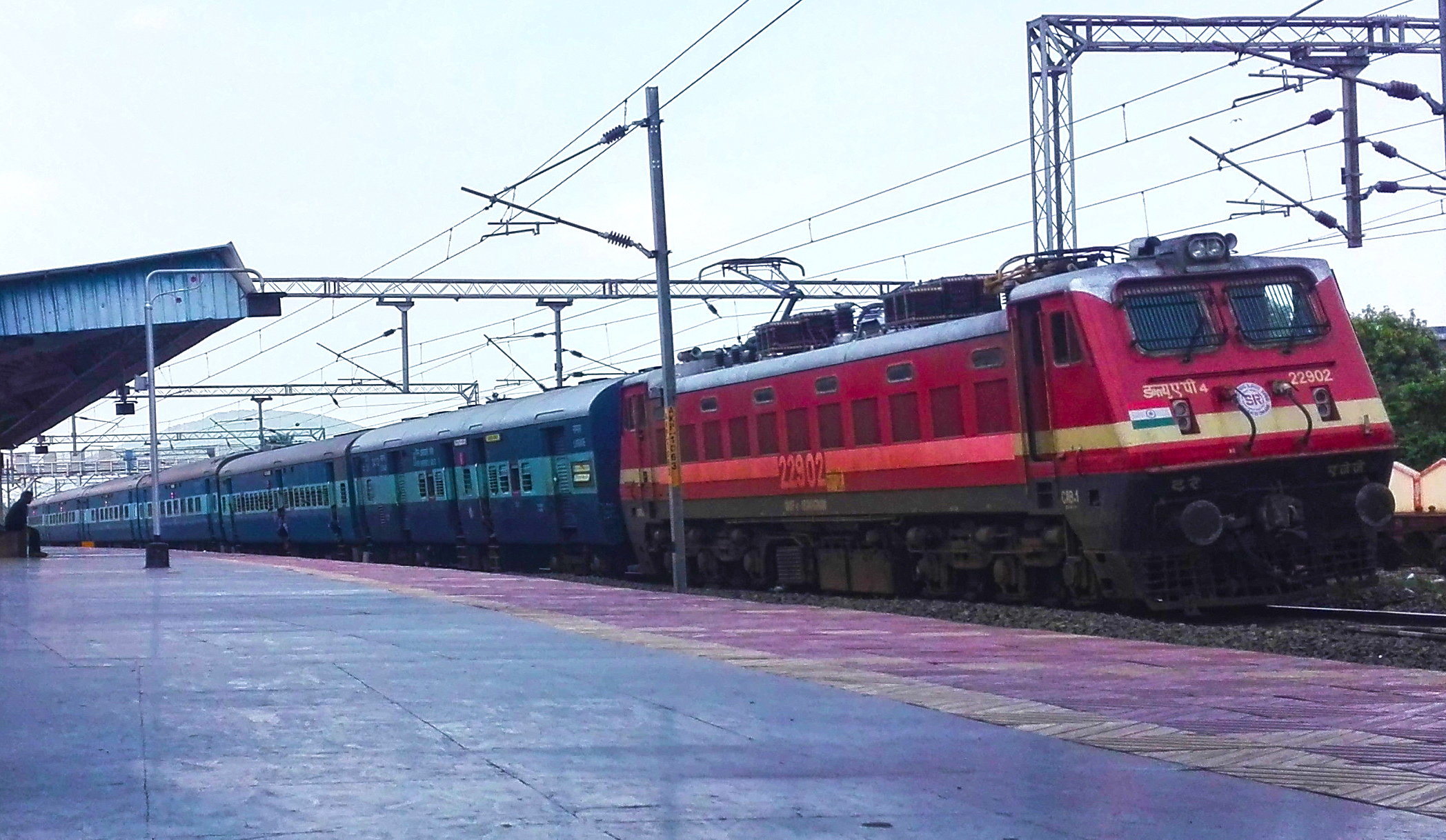
- Shalimar–Thiruvananthpuram Superfast Express passing through Anakapalle railway station

Overview
- Service type: Superfast
- First service: 6 October 1987; 38 years ago (initial service between Cochin Harbour Terminus and Howrah Junction); 1997; 29 years ago (extended to Thiruvananthapuram Central)
- Current operator: Southern Railways

Route
- Termini: Thiruvananthapuram Central; Shalimar
- Stops: 36
- Distance travelled: 2,564 km (1,593 mi)
- Average journey time: 46 hours
- Service frequency: Daily
- Train number: 22641 / 22642

On-board services
- Classes: AC 2 tier, AC 3 tier, AC 3 tier economy sleeper class, general unreserved
- Seating arrangements: Yes
- Sleeping arrangements: Yes
- Catering facilities: Yes

Technical
- Rolling stock: LHB Coaches
- Track gauge: 1,676 mm (5 ft 6 in)
- Operating speed: 55.5 km/h (34 mph)
Route map
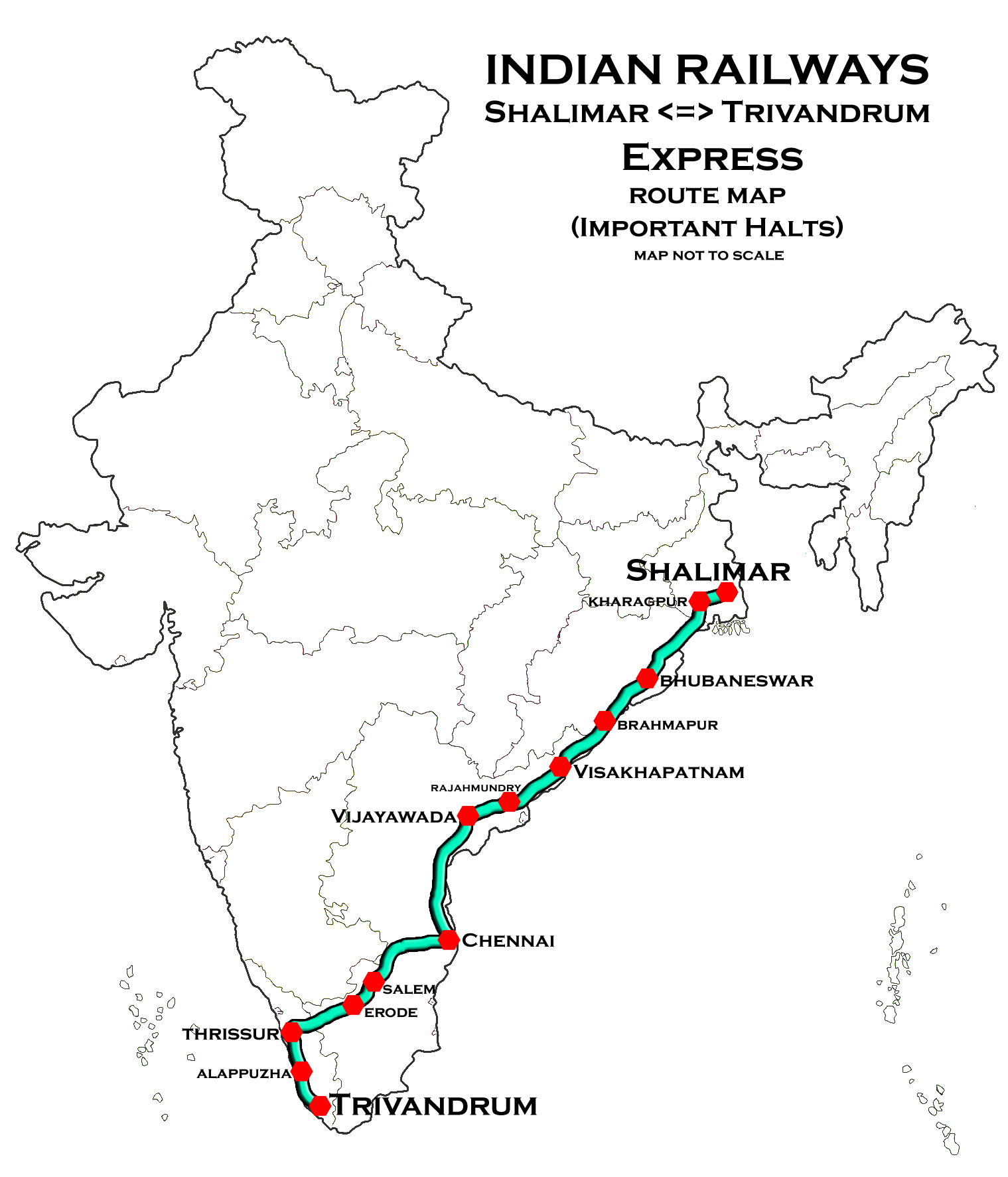

The 22641 / 42 Thiruvananthapuram–Shalimar Superfast is a Superfast train belonging to Indian Railways southern zone that runs between Thiruvananthapuram Central (Kerala) and Shalimar (West Bengal) in India.

It operates as train number 22641 from Thiruvananthapuram Central to Shalimar and as train number 22642 in the reverse direction, serving the states of Kerala, Tamil Nadu, Andhra Pradesh, Odisha, and West Bengal.

It operates on Thursdays and Saturdays ex. TVC and Sundays and Tuesdays ex. SHM

== History ==
It started operations in 1987 as 951/952 CHTS HWH Express. Later it was extended to Thiruvananthapuram Central after CHTS shut down and the terminal was shifted from HWH to SHM.

== Coaches ==
The 22641 / 42 Thiruvananthpuram−Shalimar Express has two AC 2-tier, four AC 3-tier, four AC 3-tier economy, five sleeper class, four general unreserved,one SLR (seating with luggage rake), one pantry car, one generator car and one Parcel Van, making it a 23 coacher.

As is customary with most train services in India, coach composition may be amended at the discretion of Indian Railways depending on demand.

== Service ==
The 22641 Thiruvananthapuram Central–Shalimar Express covers the distance of 2,564 km (1,593 mi) in 44 hours 50 mins (57 km/h) and in 45 hours 40 mins as the 22642 Shalimar–Thiruvananthapuram Central (56 km/h).

As the average speed of the train is slightly above 55 km/h (34 mph), as per railway rules, its fare includes a Superfast surcharge.

== Routing ==
The 22641 / 42 runs from Thiruvananthapuram Central via Kollam Junction, Alappuzha, Ernakulam Junction, Thrissur, Palakkad Junction, Coimbatore Junction, Perambur, Ongole, Vijayawada Junction, Visakhapatnam, Bhubaneswar, Kharagpur Junction to Shalimar.

== Traction ==
As the route is fully electrified, an Erode or Royapuram-based WAP-7 locomotive powers the train up to Visakhapatnam. Later, an Howrah-based WAP-7 locomotive takes the reversed direction and pulls the train to its destination.
