= Jnaneswari Express =

Train in India

Jnaneswari Super Deluxe Express
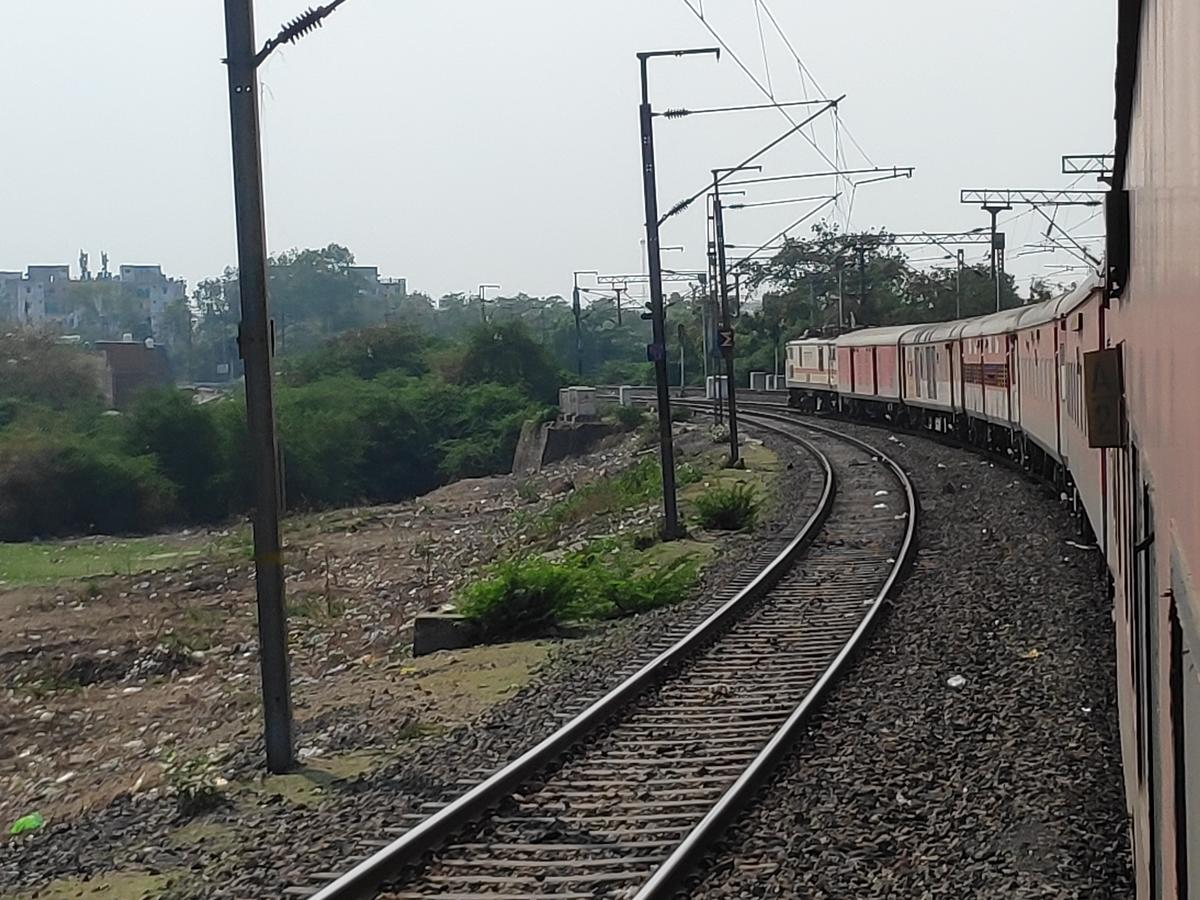
- Lokmanya Tilak Terminus bound Jnaneswari Express from Shalimar curving at the outer of Nagpur Junction with a WAP-7 Locomotive from Santragachi Loco Shed.

Overview
- Service type: Superfast Express
- Status: Running
- Locale: Maharashtra, Chhattisgarh, Odisha, Jharkhand & West Bengal
- First service: 17 August 1998; 27 years ago
- Current operator: Central Railway
- Ridership: Average weekday

Route
- Termini: Mumbai LTT (LTT); Kolkata Shalimar (SHM)
- Stops: 18
- Distance travelled: 1,943 km (1,207 mi)
- Average journey time: 30 Hours 45 Minutes
- Service frequency: 4 days a week
- Train number: 12101 / 12102

On-board services
- Classes: AC First, AC 2 Tier, AC 3 Tier, Sleeper Class, General Unreserved
- Seating arrangements: Yes
- Sleeping arrangements: Yes
- Auto-rack arrangements: Upper
- Catering facilities: Available
- Observation facilities: Large windows
- Baggage facilities: Available

Technical
- Rolling stock: LHB coach
- Track gauge: 1,676 mm (5 ft 6 in)
- Electrification: Fully Electrified
- Operating speed: 65 km/h (40 mph) average including halts.
Route map
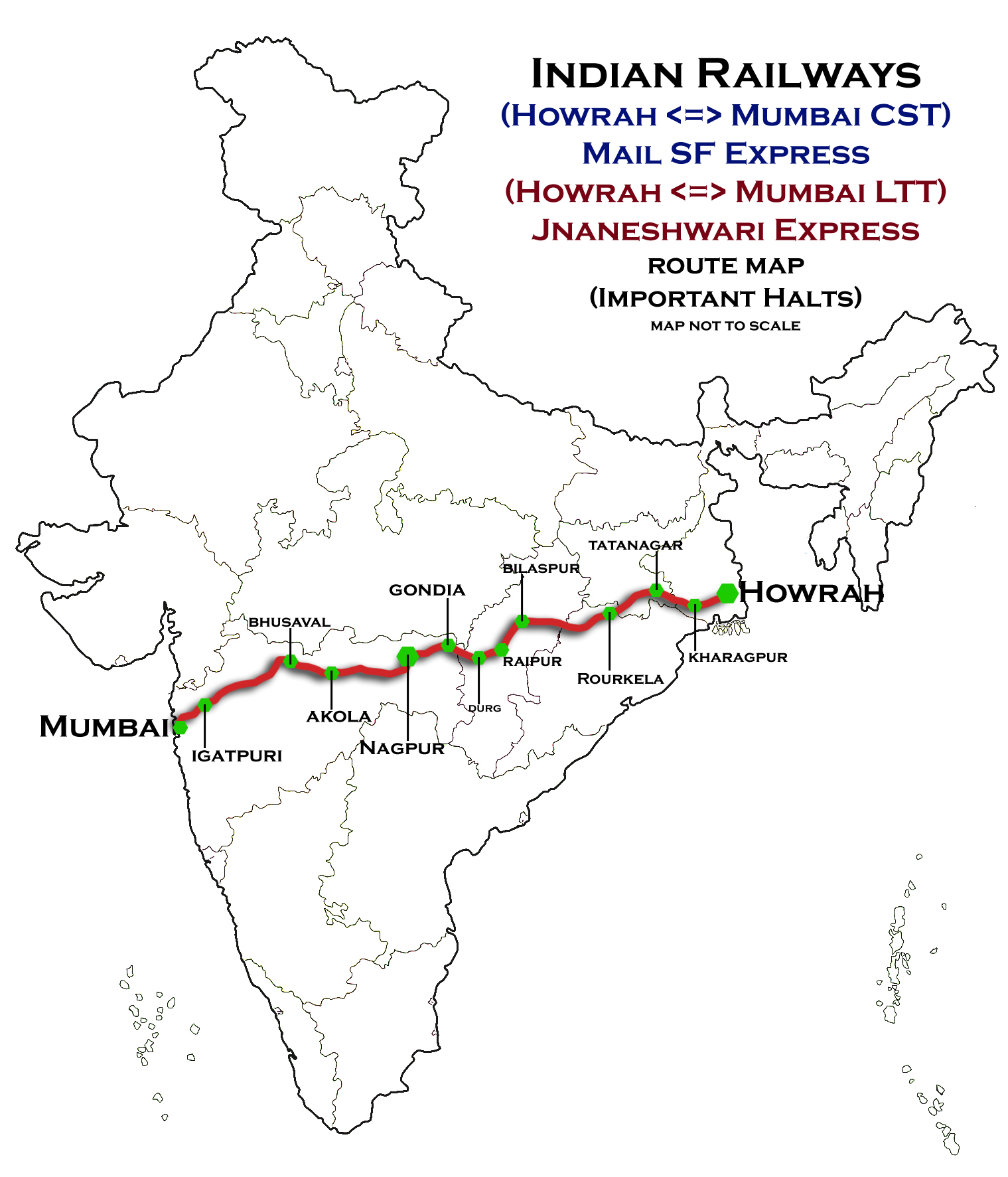

The 12101 / 12102 Jnaneshwari Super Deluxe Superfast Express, also spelled as Dnyaneswari (in Marathi) and Gyaneshwari (in Hindi), is a Superfast Express class train of Indian Railways connecting two metropolitan cities of India, Kolkata and Mumbai. Jnaneshwari Express is one of the fastest train running between Mumbai and Howrah .

== Traction ==
Earlier was WAP-4. It is hauled by a Santragachi based WAP-7 Locomotive (End to End). Top speed permissible is 130 km/h.

== Coach composition ==
earlier it was run with ICF coaches now they get an LHB coach upgrade

Loco	1	2	3	4	5	6	7	8	9	10	11	12	13	14	15	16	17	18	19	20	21	22	23
	HCPV	EOG	GEN	H1	A1	A2	B1	B2	B3	B4	B5	B6	PC	S1	S2	S3	S4	S5	S6	S7	S8	GEN	EOG

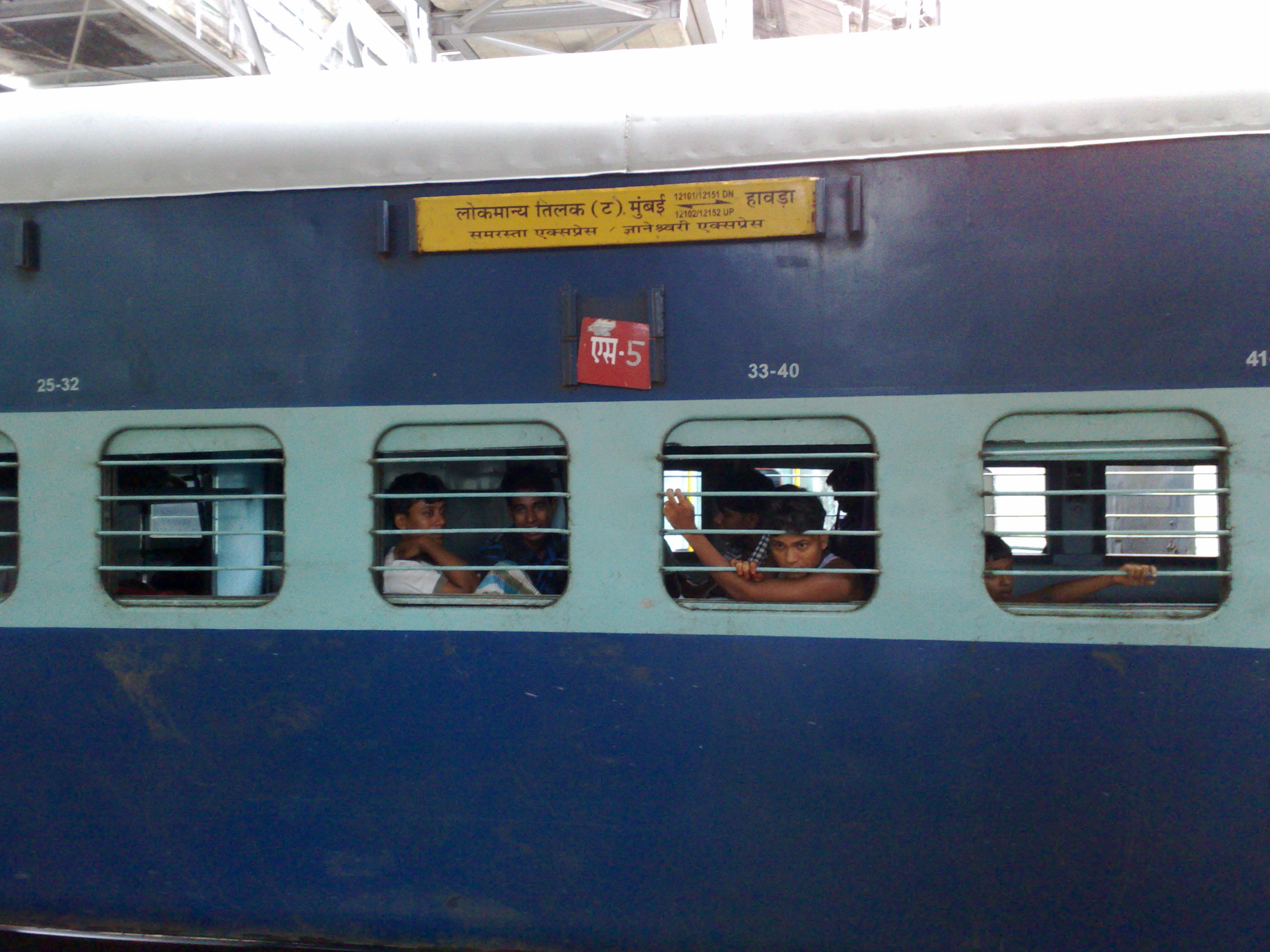
ICF coach of Jnaneswari Express

== Train schedule ==
From Lokmanya Tilak Terminus to Shalimar - 12101. The train starts from Lokmanya Tilak Terminus every Monday, Tuesday, Friday & Saturday.

Station code	Station name	Arrival	Departure
LTT	Lokmanya Tilak Terminus	---	20:35
KYN	Kalyan Junction	21:12	21:15
KSRA	Kasara	22:22	22:25
IGP	Igatpuri	22:53	22:55
BSL	Bhusaval Junction	03:00	03:05
AK	Akola	05:00	05:05
BD	Badnera	06:32	06:35
NGP	Nagpur Junction	09:35	09:40
G	Gondia	11:27	11:29
RJN	Raj Nandgaon	12:50	12:52
DURG	Durg Junction	13:35	13:40
R	Raipur Junction	14:15	14:20
BSP	Bilaspur Junction	16:10	16:25
JSG	Jharsuguda	19:15	19:17
ROU	Rourkela Junctrion	20:30	20:38
CKP	Chakradhapur	22:03	22:08
TATA	Tatanagar Junction	22:58	23:05
KGP	Kharagpur	01:15	01:20
SRC	Santragachi Junction	02:54	02:56
SHM	Kolkata Shalimar	03:20	---

Note : Train stops at Kasara & Igatpuri only for Bankers Loco attachment & removal at the back of the Train. There is no Commercial halt at these Stations.

== Accident ==
On 28 May 2010 Mumbai-bound Jnaneswari Super Deluxe Express derailed between Sardiha and Khemasuli stations of West Midnapore And approaching freight train coming from opposite tracks crashed into the Jhaneswari Super Deluxe Express train's wreck resulting of claiming 150 lives and 46 injured.
