= Shalimar–Secunderabad AC Superfast Express =

Train in India

Secunderabad–Shalimar AC Superfast Express

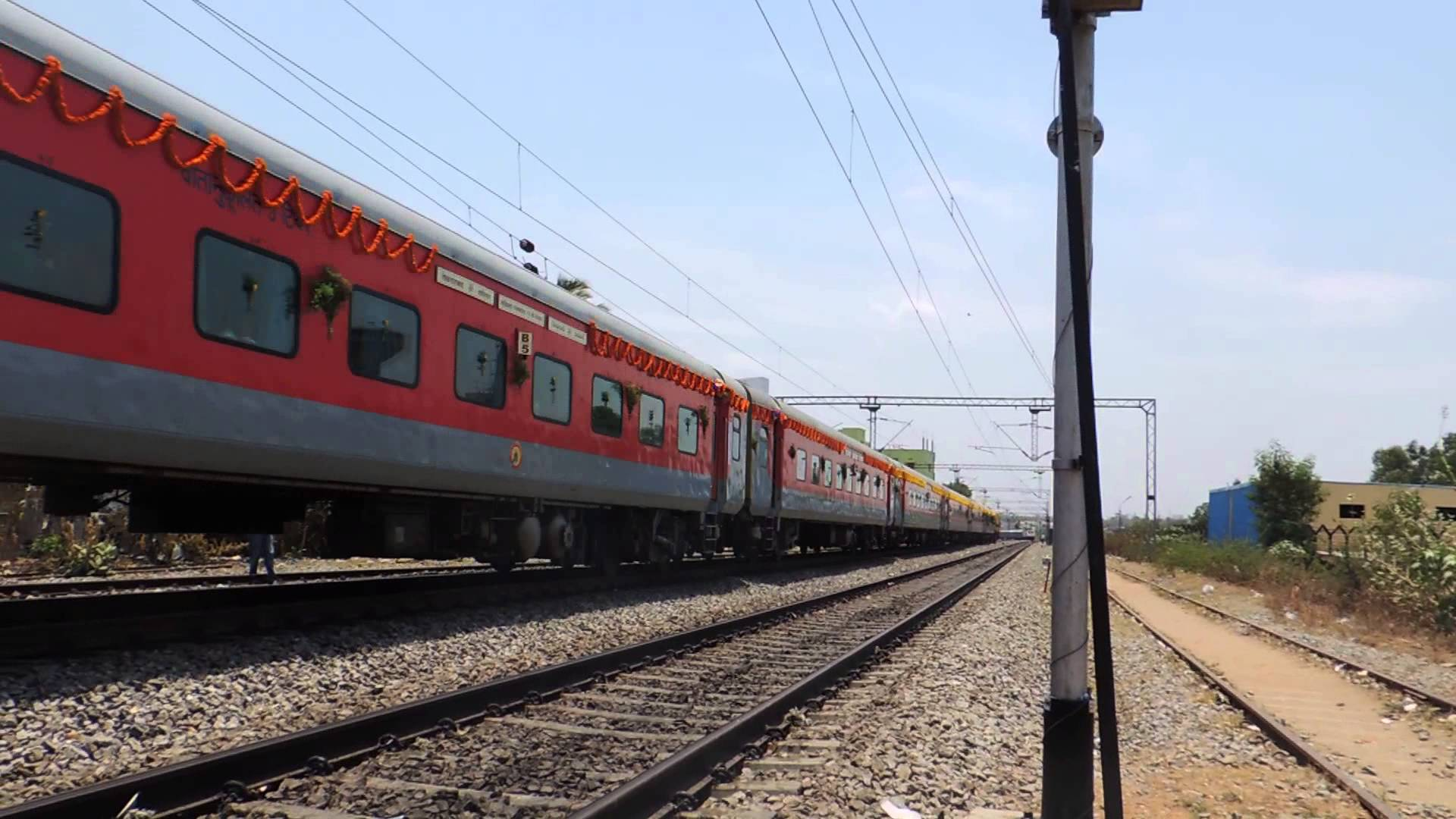
- Secunderabad–Shalimar AC Superfast Express rake.

Overview
- Service type: AC Superfast
- Locale: Telangana, Andhra Pradesh, Odisha & West Bengal
- First service: 28 May 2013; 13 years ago
- Current operator: South Central Railway

Route
- Termini: Secunderabad (SC); Shalimar (SHM)
- Stops: 14
- Distance travelled: 1,577 km (980 mi)
- Average journey time: 25 hours 55 minutes
- Service frequency: Weekly
- Train number: 12773 / 12774

On-board services
- Classes: AC First Class, AC 2 Tier, AC 3 Tier
- Seating arrangements: No
- Sleeping arrangements: Yes
- Catering facilities: On-board catering, E-catering
- Observation facilities: Large windows
- Baggage facilities: Available
- Other facilities: Below the seats

Technical
- Rolling stock: LHB coach
- Track gauge: Broad Gauge – 1,676 mm (5 ft 6 in)
- Operating speed: 60 km/h (37 mph) average including halts.
Route map
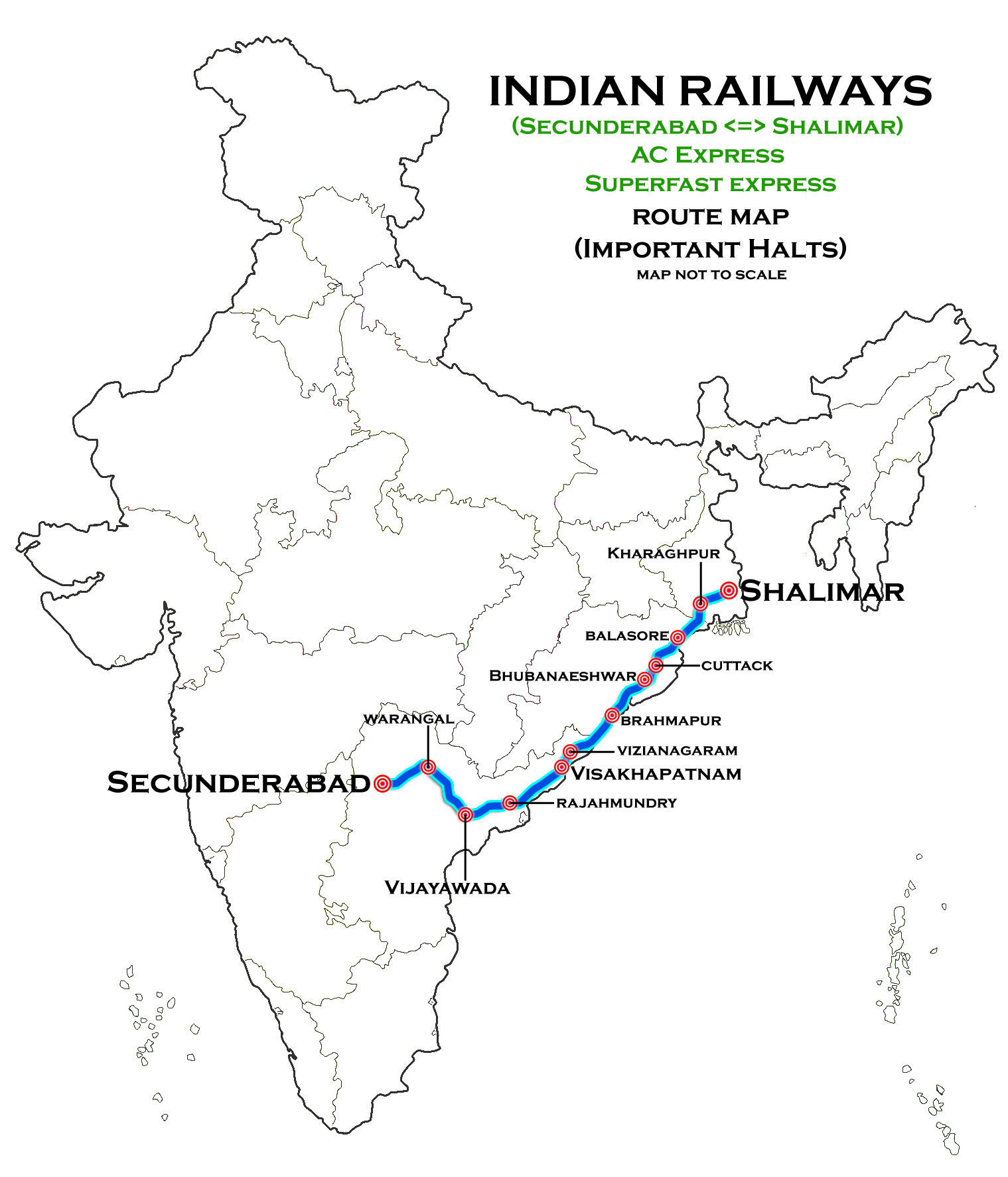

The 12773 / 12774 Secunderabad–Shalimar AC Superfast Express is a Superfast AC Express train of the Indian Railways connecting Secunderabad (SC) to Kolkata Shalimar (SHM). It is handled by the South Central Railway zone (SCR). The train was announced in the 2012 Annual Railway Budget of India and its rake was rolled out in September 2012. The train stops at 14 stations en route, connecting major cities like Vijayawada, Visakhapatnam, Bhubaneswar and Kharagpur. The train runs weekly. The train was flagged off from Secunderabad on 28 May 2013 at 11:00 am by Kotla Jayasurya Prakasha Reddy, the then Minister of State of Railways and Anjan Kumar Yadav, an MP from Secunderabad.

== Overview ==
Since the train is fully air-conditioned, it has no unreserved coaches. It has 11 third AC, three second AC and one first class coaches. Along with two generator cars, it has 17 coaches in total. The train has no pantry car and offers no catering. The up train departs Secunderabad every Tuesday at 5:30 am and arrives at Shalimar every Wednesday at 9:05 am. The down train departs Shalimar every Wednesday at 4:05 pm and arrives at Secunderabad every Thursday at 7:00 pm.

The train has a total of 14 stops en route. The up train stops at Warangal, Rajahmundry, Samalkota, Visakhapatnam, Vizianagaram, Srikakulam, Berhampur, Khordha, Bhubaneshwar, Cuttack, Balasore, Kharagpur and Santragachi.Also there is demand that halt at Eluru railway station have to be provided. Unlike most trains, this train has two rake reversals, one at Vijayawada and one at Visakhapatnam. Albeit the LHB rake, the average speed of the train is only 60 km/h. The train's rake remains idle over weekends, which resulted in it being used during May–July 2013 to run a special AC express train between Secunderabad and Visakhapatnam, the route with the highest demand in Andhra Pradesh.

== Technical ==
The train is equipped with LHB coach. They are considered to be "anti-telescopic", which means they do not get turned over, if the train derails or gets involved in a collision. These coaches are made of stainless steel and the interiors are made of aluminium which make them lighter as compared to conventional rakes. Each coach also has an "advanced pneumatic disc brake system" for efficient braking at higher speeds, "modular interiors" that integrate lighting into ceiling and luggage racks with wider windows. The improved suspension system of LHB coach ensures more riding comfort for the passengers compared to conventional rakes. The air conditioning system of the LHB coach is of higher capacity compared to the older rakes and is controlled by a microprocessor which is said to give passengers better comfort than the older coaches during summer and winter seasons. They are relatively quieter as each coach can produce a maximum noise level of 60 decibels while conventional coaches can produce 100 decibels. Each LHB coach costs between Rs 15 million to 20 million, whereas the power car which houses a generator costs about 30 million.

== Traction ==
The locomotive links for this train have not been fixed yet but often the train is hauled by a Lallaguda-based WAP-7 or WAP-4 locomotive between Secunderabad and Visakhapatnam. Then, it is often seen with an Itarsi or Bhusawal-based WAG-5.

== Similar train ==
The South Eastern Railway (SER) also runs a train along this route with the same name along with non-AC sleeper coaches. The 22849/50 Shalimar–Secunderabad Superfast Express is a weekly superfast express train of the Indian Railways operated by SER. Since it is run by SER which is headquartered in West Bengal, the train's base is at Kolkata. The up train departs Shalimar every Wednesday at 12:20 pm and arrives at Secunderabad every Thursday at 3:00 pm. The down train departs Secunderabad every Friday at 5:30 am and arrives at Shalimar every Saturday at 9:05 am. The up train departs exactly three hours and forty-five minutes before the AC express. The down train shares the same times lot as the AC Superfast run by SCR.

== See also ==
- Duronto Express – A series of point-to-point, non-stop AC/Non-AC trains run in India.
- East Coast Express (India)- A daily train connecting Hyderabad to Kolkata Howrah Junction.
- Falaknuma Express – A daily train connecting Secunderabad to Kolkata Howrah Junction.
- Hyderabad–Visakhapatnam Godavari Express – A daily train connecting Hyderabad Deccan to Visakhapatnam.
- Visakha Express – A daily train connecting Secunderabad to Bhubaneshwar.
- Gowthami Express – A daily train connecting Lingampalli to Kakinada port
