= Santragachi–Mangaluru Central Vivek Express =

Superfast Express train belonging to Indian Railways South Eastern Zone

Mangaluru Central – Shalimar Vivek Superfast Express

Overview
- Service type: Vivek Express
- First service: 19 February 2012; 14 years ago
- Current operator: South Eastern Railway zone

Route
- Termini: Shalimar; Mangaluru Central
- Stops: 39
- Distance travelled: 2,487 km (1,545 mi)
- Average journey time: 42 hours 59 mins
- Service frequency: Weekly
- Train number: 22851 / 22852

On-board services
- Classes: first Class AC, AC 2 tier, AC 3 tier, sleeper class, general unreserved
- Seating arrangements: Yes
- Sleeping arrangements: Yes
- Auto-rack arrangements: yes
- Catering facilities: On-board catering E-catering
- Observation facilities: Wide windows
- Entertainment facilities: yes
- Baggage facilities: Yes

Technical
- Rolling stock: LHB Coaches
- Track gauge: 1,676 mm (5 ft 6 in)
- Electrification: Yes
- Operating speed: 69 km/h (43 mph)
Route map
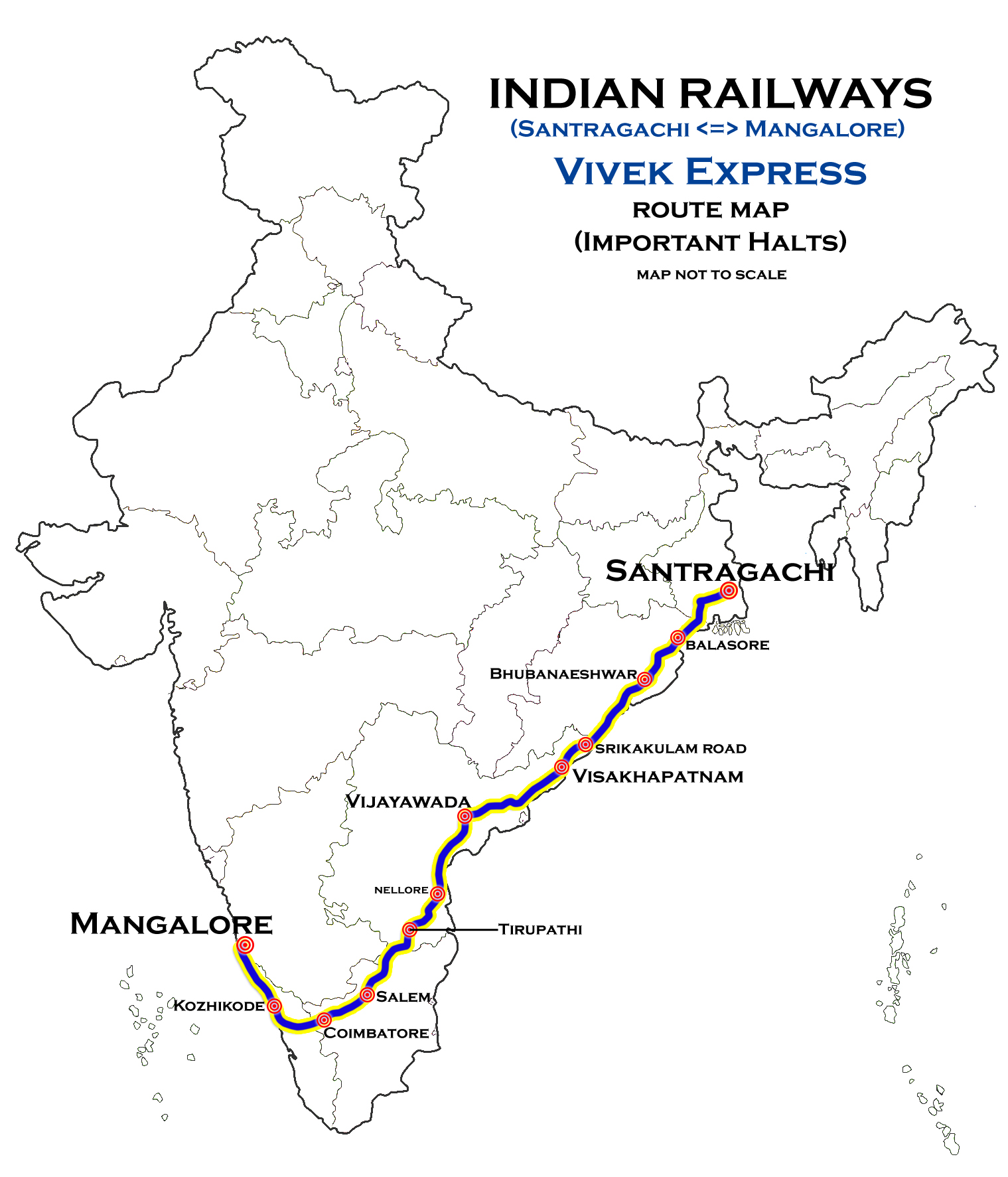

The 22851/52 Shalimar – Mangaluru Central – Santragachi Vivek Superfast Express is a Weekly Superfast Express train belonging to Indian Railways South Eastern Zone that runs between Shalimar , West Bengal and Mangaluru Central , Karnataka in India.

It operates as train number 22851 from Shalimar to Mangalore Central and as train number 22852 in the reverse direction, serving the states of West Bengal, Odisha, Andhra Pradesh, Tamil Nadu, Kerala & Karnataka.

== Coaches ==
The 22851/52 Santragachi–Mangaluru Central Vivek Express has One AC 1-tier, Three AC 2-tier, Four AC 3-tier, 12 sleeper class, Two General Unreserved and Two End on Generation (EOG) Coaches. It does not carry a pantry car.

As is customary with most train services in India, coach composition may be amended at the discretion of Indian Railways depending on demand.

== Service ==
The 22851 Santragachi–Mangalore Central Vivek Express covers the distance of 2,487 km (1,545 mi) in 41 hours 55 mins (59 km/h) and in 42 hours 15 mins as the 22852 Mangalore Central–Santragachi Vivek Express (59 km/h).

As the average speed of the train is above 55 km/h (34 mph), as per railway rules, its fare includes a Superfast surcharge. This would be the only Vivek Express with Superfast tag hence the fastest Vivek Express.

== Routing ==
The 22851 / 52 Santragachi–Mangalore Central Vivek Express important stops are:- Santragachi Junction, Kharagpur Junction, Jaleswar, Balasore, Jajpur Keonjhar Road, Cuttack Junction, Bhubaneswar, Khurda Road Junction, Brahmapur, Sompeta, Palasa, Srikakulam Road, Vizianagaram Junction, Visakhapatnam, Samalkot Junction, Rajahmundry, Eluru, Vijayawada Junction, Ongole, Nellore, Gudur Junction, Renigunta Junction, Tirupati, Chittoor, Katpadi Junction, Salem Junction, Erode Junction, Tiruppur, Coimbatore Junction, Palakkad Junction, Shoranur Junction, Tirur, Kozhikode, Vadakara, Thalassery, Kannur, Payyanur, Kanhangad, Kasaragod & Mangalore Central.

== Traction ==
Earlier they run by diesel locomotives WDP-4/4D and WDM-3A. As the entire route is electrified, a Santragachi Junction-based WAP-7 and WAP-5 or WAP-4 electric locomotives pulls the train up to Visakhapatnam, then a Erode or Lallaguda-based WAP-7 and WAP-5 or WAP-4 electric locomotives takes reverse direction and pulls the train up to Mangalore Central.

== Reverse ==
The train is reversed in Visakhapatnam.

== Rake composition ==
earlier was ICF coaches now this train received LHB coaches

- 1 AC I Tier
- 3 AC II Tier
- 4 AC III Tier
- 12 Sleeper Coaches
- 2 EOG &SLR
- 2 General Unreserved
- 2 End on Generation (EOG) Coaches

Loco-WAP 7 (GOMO, VISAKHAPATNAM, VIJAYAWADA, HOWRAH, SANTRAGACHI, ROYAPURAM, PUNE LOCO SHEDS )	1	2	3	4	5	6	7	8	9	10	11	12	13	14	15	16	17	18	19	20	21	22	23	24
| WAP 7 I |EOG	GEN	GEN	S1	S2	S3	S4	S5	S6	S7	S8	S9	S10	S11	S12	B1	B2	B3	B 5|H1|B 6|A1|A 3	A2	A3	EOG			
