= Shalimar railway station =

Railway Station in West Bengal, India

Shalimar
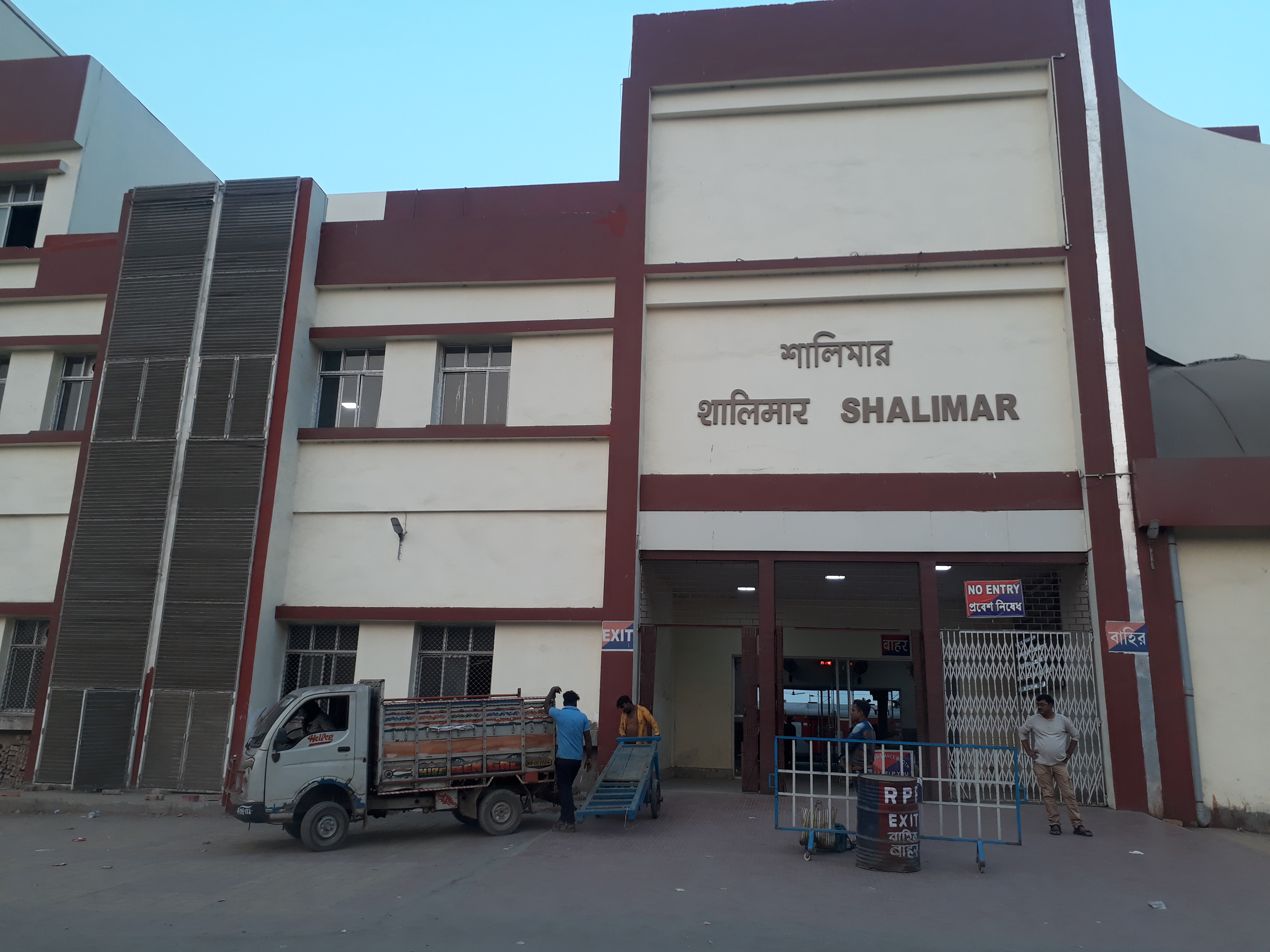
- Shalimar railway station, West Bengal

General information
- Location: Shibpur, Howrah, West Bengal; India
- Coordinates: 22°33′18″N 88°18′55″E
- Elevation: 4.5 metres (15 ft)
- System: Indian Railways; Kolkata Suburban Railway
- Owner: Indian Railways
- Operator: South Eastern Railway
- Lines: Shalimar–Santragachi line , Kolkata Suburban Railway
- Platforms: 3
- Tracks: 18
- Connections: Shalimar ferry ghat (U/C); Shalimar station bus stop

Construction
- Structure type: At grade
- Parking: Available
- Cycle facilities: Available
- Accessible: Yes

Other information
- Status: Active
- Station code: SHM
- Zone(s): South Eastern Railway
- Division(s): Kharagpur

History
- Opened: 1905; 121 years ago
- Electrified: 2001; 25 years ago
- Former names: Shalimar rail yard

Services
Preceding station	Kolkata Suburban Railway	Following station
Padmapukur towards Amta	South Eastern Line Shalimar-Amta Branch Line	Terminus
Location
- Location within Kolkata Location within West Bengal Location within India

Shalimar railway station (SHM) is a Railway Terminus located in Shibpur, Howrah of West Bengal. It is one of important railway station serving the Kolkata metropolitan region, India. The other stations are Sealdah, Howrah, Kolkata, Dankuni and Santragachi Junction. Shalimar station is situated on the western bank of Hooghly River.

== History ==
The place where now the station is situated was formerly a very small rail station, and served by some diesel loco hauled trains. The present platforms were occupied by some goods lines. Those lines were a part of large Shalimar rail yard.

In 2000, the first plan was conceived to use this area as a bigger rail station. The rapidly growing long-distance passengers were gradually overcrowding the Howrah station. Due to the limitation of space, new platform construction is restricted at Howrah. Although 3 new platforms (17, 22 & 23) were constructed at Howrah during 2006 – 2008, those were not sufficient. Side by side, due to its almost central position in Howrah, Howrah station is too busy for both suburban and long-distance rail traffic. Unlike Sealdah station, Howrah station has fewer suburban trains than long-distance trains. Due to increasing of Eastern Railway trains, many platforms, which were previously built for South Eastern Railway trains, now often occupied by Eastern Railway trains. But many people of Howrah feel that it is much easy to catch a long-distance train from Howrah than Santragachi, particularly in early morning and late night. But due to platform limitation, increasing the number of long-distance trains was not possible from Howrah for South Eastern Railway.

To overcome this problem, South Eastern Railway suggested to Indian Railway officers to construct another bigger rail station at Howrah, mostly for long-distance trains. The many underused tracks of Shalimar yard was the first choice of the authority.

Construction started from 2000. The construction of platforms, station buildings, and car parking area were started. After the completion, other tracks were re-aligned. The tracks around platform were completely electrified for passenger coaches shunting. At first, only one express train started. This train stopped later and then other long-distance trains started. From this time, diesel loco-hauled trains were replaced by EMU trains, which started suburban services.

== Facilities ==
There is a taxi stand and a toto (e-rickshaw) stand outside the station. The nearest tram terminus was formerly Shibpur, but it was closed in 1971. There are small eateries serving snacks on the platform and eateries serving lunch outside the station.

== Major Trains ==
Major trains originating from Shalimar railway station are as follows:

- Shalimar–Patna AC Duronto Express (22213/22214)
- Shalimar–Secunderabad AC Superfast Express (12773/12774)
- Shalimar–Chennai Central Superfast Express (22825/22826)
- Shalimar – Vasco da Gama Amaravati Express (18047/18048)
- Shalimar - Nagercoil Gurudev Express (12659/12660)
- Shalimar - Thiruvananthapuram Express (22641/22642)
- Shalimar - Hyderabad East Coast Express (18045/18046)
- Shalimar–Lokmanya Tilak Terminus Express (18029/18030)
- Shalimar - Puri Sri Jagannath Express (18409/18410)
- Shalimar - Bhojudih Aranyak Express (12885/12886)
- Shalimar - Lokmanya Tilak Terminus Samarsata Express (12151/12152)
- Shalimar - Lokmanya Tilak Terminus Jnaneswari Express (12101/12102)
- Shalimar - Visakhapatnam Superfast Express (22853/22854)
- Shalimar - Sambalpur Mahima Gosain Express (20831/20832)
- Shalimar - Badampahar Express (18049/18050)
- Shalimar–Gorakhpur Express (15021/15022)
- Shalimar–Udaipur City Weekly Express (20971/20972)
- Shalimar–Porbandar Superfast Express (12905/12906)
- Shalimar–Bhuj Weekly Superfast Express (22829/22830)
- Shalimar - Okha Superfast Express (22905/22906)
- Shalimar - Puri Express (12887/12888)
- Shalimar - Puri Garib Rath Express (12881/12882)
- Shalimar - Sambalpur Superfast Express (22803/22804)
- Shalimar - Bhanjpur Simlipal Intercity Express (18007/18008)

== See also ==
- Howrah station
- Sealdah Station
- Kolkata station
- Dankuni station
- Kolkata Suburban Railway
- Kolkata Metro
- Trams in Kolkata
