= Muirpur Airport =

Domestic airport in Uttar Pradesh, India

- IATA: none; ICAO: VI1D

Summary
- Airport type: Government
- Owner: Government of Uttar Pradesh
- Operator: Government of Uttar Pradesh
- Serves: Sonbhadra, Singrauli, Balrampur-Ramanujganj, Garhwa
- Location: Muirpur, Sonbhadra, Uttar Pradesh, India
- Elevation AMSL: 1,122 ft / 342 m
- Coordinates: 24°07′33″N 083°02′36″E

Map
- Location of the airport in Uttar Pradesh VI1D (India)

Runways
Direction	Length		Surface
Direction	ft	m	Surface
08/26	6,560	2,000	Asphalt

Muirpur Airport also spelled as Myorpur Airport is an upcoming airport, situated at Myorpur approx 12 km (7.5 mi) from the Renukut in the Sonbhadra district in the Indian state of Uttar Pradesh. Airport is developing by upgrading the existing government airstrip. It serves nearby towns, Northern Coalfields Limited (NCL) (coal fields), NTPC projects Renukut and Robertsganj, the Other towns of Sonbhadra and Singrauli district of Madhya Pradesh. Balrampur-Ramanujganj district of Chhattisgarh and Garhwa district of Jharkhand. The airport serves the region which has many electrical power stations, known as the "Energy Capital of India". It is 26.5 km (16.5 mi) away from DUDHI TEHSIL. The proposed airport will boost the power sector of the nation and more investment will be made in the power sector internationally. This Airport will be connected to a nearby railway and bus station.

== Destinations ==
Domestic proposed flights will directly operate from Lucknow.

== Communities served ==
- OYNEERAJ OPC PVT LTD
- Rihandnagar NTPC
- Shaktinagar NTPC
- Vindhyanagar NTPC
- Anpara UPRVUNL
- Obra UPRVUNL
- Renusagar UPRVUNL
- Pipri UPRVUNL
- Singrauli
- Renusagar Hindalco
- Finiva Group Of Company
- Finiva Nidhi Limited
- Finiva Financial Limited
- Finiva Tech Limited
- Finiva Retail Limited
- Dalla Dalla Cement Factory etc.

== See also ==
- Lucknow International Airport
- Varanasi International Airport
- Bareilly Airport
- Kanpur Airport
- Faizabad Airport
- Gorakhpur Airport
