= Rehta =

Village

Coordinates: 24.1738°N 82.7755°E

Rehta is a village in Sonbhadra district, Uttar Pradesh, India.

It is a village neighbouring Kakri. The postal/pin code of Rehta village is 231220. According to Census 2011 Rehta village is located in Dudhi Tehsil of Sonbhadra district in Uttar Pradesh, India. It is situated 68 km away from sub-district headquarter Dudhi and 105 km away from district headquarter Sonbhadra. As per 2009 stats, its also Gram Panchayat.

The total geographical area of village is 67.74 hectares. Rehta has a total population of 3,778 peoples. There are about 586 houses in Rehta village. Anpara is nearest town to Rehta which is approximately 4 km away.
