= Agori Fort =

- Agorigarh
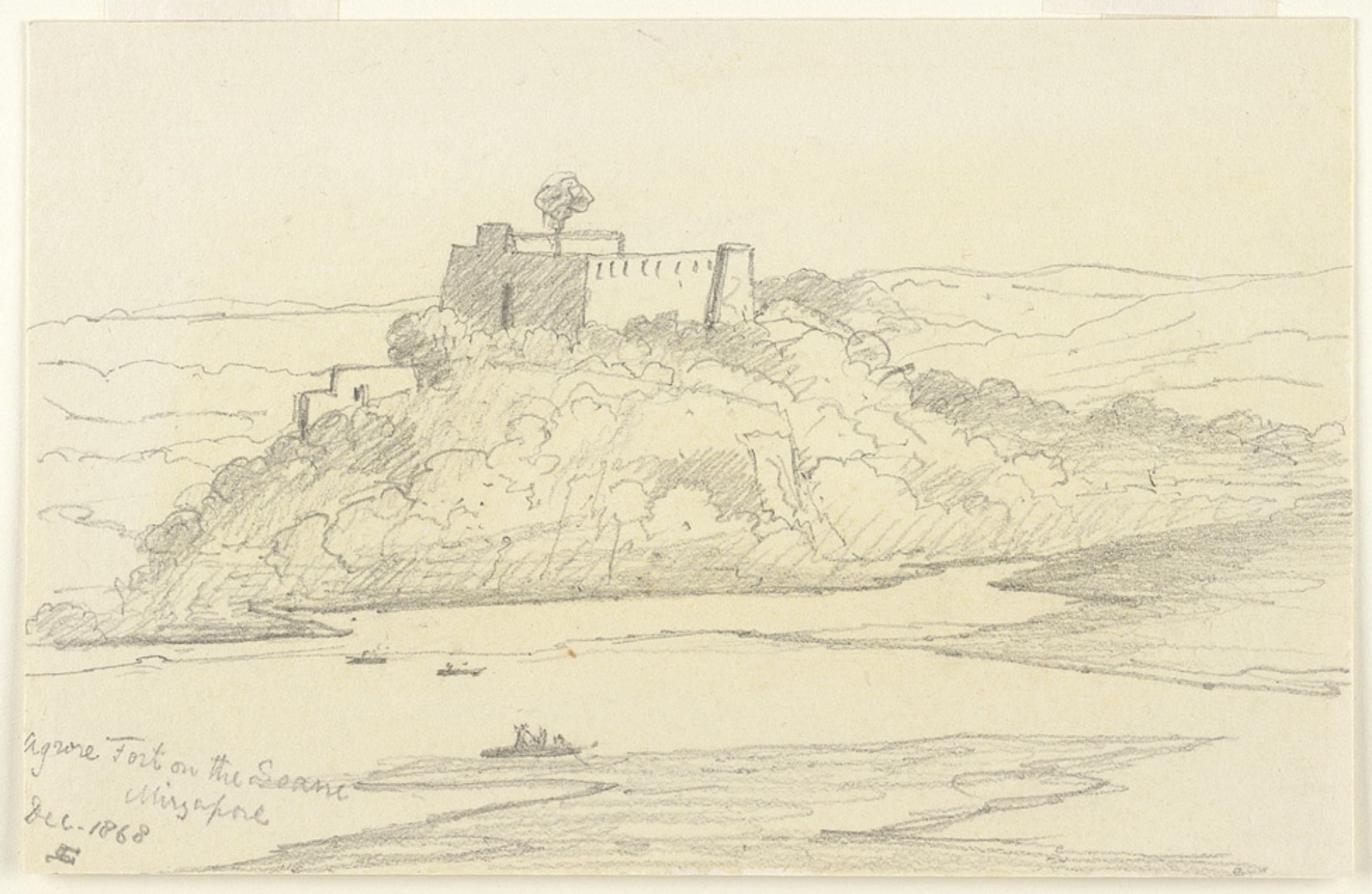
- Back view of Agori Fort. Pencil drawing of the Fort in December 1868, by Stanley Leighton
- Interactive map of Agori Fort
- 24.33°N 82.58°E
- Location: Sonbhadra
- Nearest city: Chopan and Obra

Agori Fort is a fort located about 10 km from Chopan near Obra by the Son River, in the Sonbhadra district in the Indian state of Uttar Pradesh. A Kali temple is there. It is a religious place for the Agori Baba.Agori Fort was the seat of the chandel Raja of agori barhar, who defeated the local khairwar chief in 12 the cth and settled here.

== History ==
The Rihand and Sonnadi rivers meet in Agori. A Persian inscription of 1026 Hijri (1616 AD) is in one part of the fort. The agori fort was captured by Chandel Rajputs in 1187 they settled near Bardi Raj and Agori Barhar. They defeated the local Khairwar chief who to used rule in this area. In 1182 the Chandela dynasty was ruled by Maharajadhiraja Parmardi Deva. They faced a raid by Maharajadhiraja Prithviraja Chauhan in 1182, at the same Maharaja Parmardi Deva was busy campaigning in Baghelkhand and Tripuri on the Kalchuris (inscription dated 1183). At that time Maharaja Prithviraja's army and Chandel's army fought in Madanpur. Later, Madanpur was captured by Prithviraja Chauhan but within 6 months Chandels recaptured it. During the campaign of Parmardi Deva in Baghelkhand and Tripuri, he defeated the Kalchuris.

In 1187 one of the Parmardi Deva's son Raja Bhram Jit (Bhram Deo) came there in the region of Bardi and Agori Barhar and defeated the local Khairwar chief and started to rule. He had 2 sons Bharimal and Primal. Bharimal became the independent Maharaja of Bardi and Parimal became the independent ruler of Agori. Throughout history, the Chandels of Agori barhar fought many battles. In 1226 the younger brother of raja of bardi Bir Bikram Singh founded the Gidhaur Raj in Bihar. Later on in 1620 Agori Barhar came under Mughal rule. Agori Barhar had 400 villages under their rule and a revenue of around 2 lakh rupees in 1871.

== Location ==
The fort is surrounded by rivers from three sides: Bijul/Vijul/Vrijul, Rihand and Son River. It has been enclosed with trenches on all sides to protect it from any attack.

== Attractions ==
The war between Molagt King and Veer Lorik was held there. An artistic idol of the Goddess Durga sits in the fort at the courtyard entrance. A well is there. Thousands of people visit to worship.

A stone in the form of an elephant sits at the center of the river called Krmaamel elephant of Molagt King who was killed by Veer Lorik. The fort can be reached by boat from Chopan.

== See also ==
- Stanley Leighton
- Vijaygarh Fort
- Sonbhadra
