= Makara, Dudhi =

Village in Sonbhadra district, Uttar Pradesh, India

Makara is a village situated in Dudhi subdistrict of the Sonbhadra district of Uttar Pradesh.

The Village is nearly 5 Kilometres away from Govind Ballabh Pant Sagar and around 25 Kilometres from Renukoot.

The village is rich in greenery and there is environment friendly and healthy atmosphere here.

However, the village lacks in development as it is located in the remote area, away from city and any industry.

== Census report ==
Population	1788
Total No. of Houses	328
Literacy Rate	58.36%
Male population in the Village	921
Female Population in the Village	867

== Schools ==
- Primary School Makara

== Railway station ==
The nearest railway station from the village is Renukoot railway station, which is about 20 kilometres from the village.
