= List of forts in Uttar Pradesh =

Forts In Uttar Pradesh

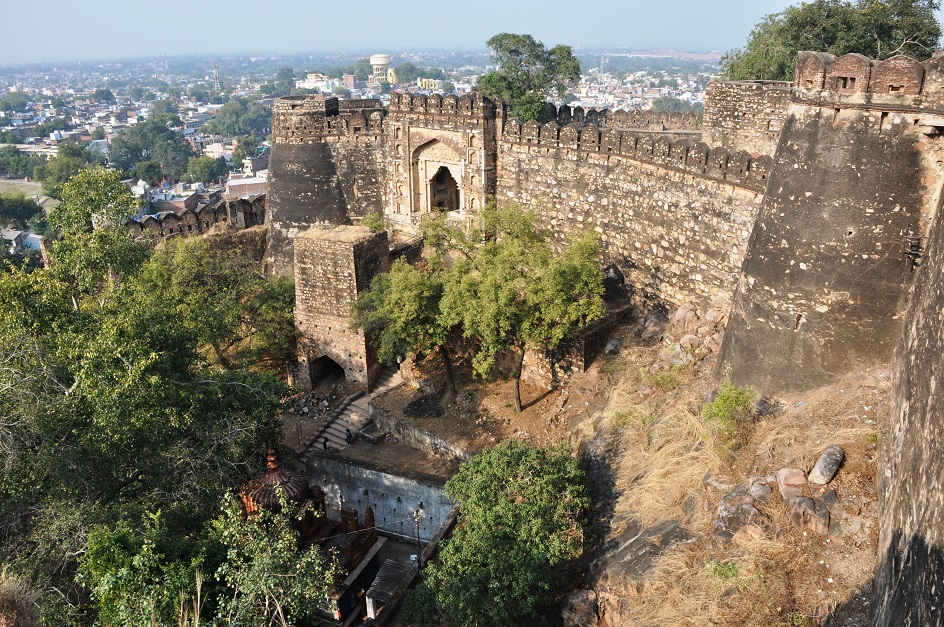
Jhansi Fort

== Intro ==
There Are Many Forts and Fortresses In Uttar Pradesh, India, which were made by Muslim Rulers, Hindu Rulers And Many Local Rulers. Every Fort Have Its Own Story.

== List Of Forts ==
Fort	Location
Agori Fort	Sonbhadra
Kuchesar Fort	Bulandshahr
Fort Unchagaon	Bulandshahr
Senapati Fortress	Mahoba
Agra Fort	Agra
Sikandra Fort	Agra
Fatehpur Sikri Fort	Fatehpur Sikri
Kotla Fort	Firozabad
Chandrawar Fort	Firozabad
Dherpura Fort	Firozabad
Awagarh Fort	Etah District
Gabhana Fort	Gabhana
Aligarh Fort	Aligarh
Jhansi Fort	Jhansi
Hathras Fort	Hathras
Mainpuri Fort	Mainpuri
Barua Sagar Fort	Jhansi
Fort Ruhya	Awadh
Ramnagar Fort	Varanasi
Allahabad Fort	Allahabad
Kalinjar Fort	Banda district
Ramnagar Fort	Varanasi
Chunar Fort	Mirzapur district
Vijaygarh Fort	Sonbhadra district
Shahi Qila, Jaunpur	Jaunpur
Dalmau Fort	Raebareli
Dileepnagar Fort	Kushinagar
Majhauli Fort	Deoria
Jagammanpur Fort	Jalaun
Mahoba Fort	Mahoba
Devgarh Fort	Lalitpur
Baundi Fort	Bahraich
