= Amiriti =

Amiriti is a village in Sonebhadra, Uttar Pradesh, India.
