= Sahdeya Baidar =

Village in Uttar Pradesh, India

Sahdeya Baidar is a village in Sonebhadra, Uttar Pradesh, India.
