= Sonbhadra massacre =

Massacre in Uttar Pradesh, India

On 17 July 2019, eleven people were killed in a massacre in Ubbha village, Sonbhadra district, in the Indian state of Uttar Pradesh. The Gond tribals had refused to vacate land claimed by the village headman, Yagyadutt, who belonged to the dominant Gujjar community. Their resistance to his attempts to take their land led Yagyadutt to bring in goons and fire on the Gonds. The next day, the Scheduled Castes and Scheduled Tribes Commission of Uttar Pradesh asked the state government to invoke Gangster Act against the accused. The incident quickly gained national outrage as an example of caste-based killings and was taken up by the opposition as an example of the "Jungle Raj" of the Yogi Adityanath-led BJP government in the state.

== Background ==
The land dispute at the heart of the massacre goes back several decades, almost to Independence. During this time, as in much of Northern India, tribal land was being stolen and transferred to charitable trusts. In Ubbha, this trust was Adikari Sahkari Samiti, which took over the land in 1955, and it eventually came under the control of an IAS officer named Prabhat Kumar Mishra. This land was sold to Yagyadutt in 2017.
