= Kachnarwa =

Coordinates: 24°22′N 83°21′E

Kachnarwa is a village in Sonebhadra, Uttar Pradesh, India.
