= Ayalahi =

Ayalahi is a village in Sonebhadra, Uttar Pradesh, India.
