= Jamshila =

- census town
- Location in Uttar Pradesh, India
- Coordinates: 24.145°N 82.762°E
- Country: India
- State: Uttar Pradesh
- District: Sonbhadra

Population (2001)
  - Total: 10,270

Languages
  - Official: Hindi
- Time zone: UTC+5:30 (IST)

Jamshila is a census town in Sonbhadra district in the Indian state of Uttar Pradesh.

== Demographics ==
As of 2001 India census, Jamshila had a population of 10,270. Males constitute 55% of the population and females 45%. Jamshila has an average literacy rate of 74%, higher than the national average of 59.5%: male literacy is 82%, and female literacy is 65%. In Jamshila, 11% of the population is under 6 years of age.
