= Belkhuri =

Belkhuri is a village in Sonebhadra, Uttar Pradesh, India.
