= Sirwit Ganeshpur =

Sirwit Ganeshpur is a village in Sonebhadra, Uttar Pradesh, India.
