= Orgai =

Orgai is a village in Sonebhadra, Uttar Pradesh, India.
