= Karvania =

Karvania is a village in Sonebhadra, Uttar Pradesh, India.
