= Nagnar Haraiya =

Village in Uttar Pradesh, India

Nag Nar Haraiya is a village in Sonebhadra, Uttar Pradesh, India.
