= Renukeshwar Mahadev Temple =

Hindu Temple in Uttar Pradesh, India

- श्री रेनुकेश्वर महादेव मन्दिर
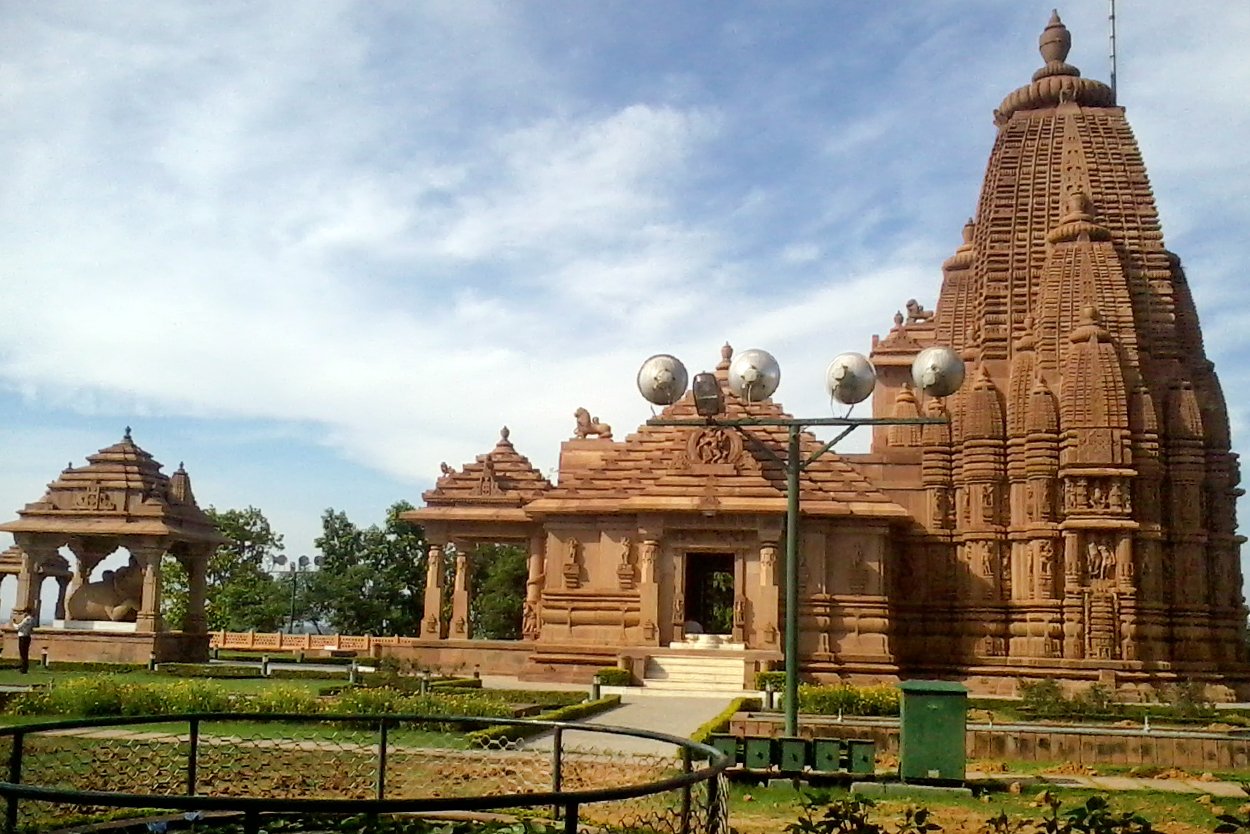

Religion
- Affiliation: Hinduism
- Deity: Renukeshwar Mahadev
- Festivals: Shravan, shivratri

Location
- Location: Renukoot, Sonbhadra
- State: Uttar Pradesh
- Country: India
- Interactive map of Renukeshwar Mahadev Temple
- Coordinates: 24°12′45″N 83°2′17″E

Architecture
- Type: copy of Khajuraho
- Creator: Birala Family
- Completed: 1972

Website
- https://sonbhadra.nic.in

Renukeshwar Mahadev Temple is situated in Renukoot in Sonbhadra district, Uttar Pradesh. It is located adjoining the Rihand River which is also called Renu River, from where this temple got its name. The temple is dedicated to Mahadev or Lord Shiva. The temple was built by Birla Group in the year 1972.

== Attractions ==
The main entrance features a carving that presents Sun god on the chariot. The second gate presents stone carvings of elephants at either side. The temple grounds include garden fountains.
