= Veer Lorik =

Bhojpuri Folklore

Veer Ahir Lorik is part of the Bhojpuri folklore of Bihar and eastern Uttar Pradesh, India. According to S.M. Pandey, it is considered to be the different Ramayana version Yadav warrior. Pandey notes that the three castes whose members sing the Loriki are the Dhadhor (Danhor), Kishnaut and Gval (Gvalbansi) all these comes of Yaduvanshi Branches. Veer Lorik is a divine character of this. The Veer Lorik Stone on the banks of the Son River in the Sonbhadra, Uttar Pradesh, contains a love story. He is sometimes known as the Lorikayan, after the folkloric tale of that name.

== Story ==
During the 5th century, there was a state called Agori along the Son River (now located in Sonbhadra district). Molagat bhar, the ruling king of the state, despite being a very good king, was jealous of a man named Mehra because of the power he wielded.

One day King Molagat Bhar invited Mehra to a gambling match. It was proposed that the winner of the gambling game will rule over the state. Mehra accepted the king's proposal and they began gambling. The king lost everything and had to leave his kingdom. Seeing the plight of the king, Lord Brahma came as a disguised monk and gave him some coins, assuring him that once he plays a game with those coins, his rule would return. The king obeyed, and won. Mehra lost six times and gambled everything away, including his wife, who was pregnant. In the seventh time, he lost his wife's womb as well. But the king seemed to show generosity towards Mehra. He said that if the upcoming baby is a boy then he will work in the stables and if it is girl, she will be appointed in the service of the Queen.

Mehra's seventh child was born as a girl, and named Manjari. When the King discovered this, he sent soldiers to bring Manjari to him. But Manjari's mother refused to part with her daughter. Instead, she sent a message to the king that he would have to kill Manjari's husband if he wanted to take her with him.

Hence, Manjari's parents were anxious to find a suitor for Manjari who could defeat the king after the wedding. Manjari asked her parents to go to the place of the people named Balia where they will find a youngster named Veer Lorik. He was her lover in a previous life, and also capable of defeating the king.

Manjari and Lorik's father met and the marriage gets fixed. Lorik comes over with half a million people for the wedding, to marry Manjari. When they reached the bank of the river son, the king sent his troops to fight Lorik and capture Manjari. Lorik seemed to be defeated in the war by molagat bhar. Manjari, being an extraordinary girl, goes to Veer Lorik and tells him that there is a village named Gothani near the Agori Fort. She tells him that there is a temple of Lord Shiva in that village and if he goes there and prays to the god, victory will be his.

Lorik does what Manjari said and wins the war so the both married each other. Before leaving the threshold of the village, Manjari tells Lorik to do something great so that the people remember that they loved each other to such an extent. Veer Lorik asked Manjari that what must he do so that it becomes a symbol of true love and no loving couple would ever return disappointed from here. Manjari, pointing at a stone, asked Lorik to cut the stone with the same sword he used to kill the King. Lorik did the same, the stone got cut in two pieces. Manjari applied vermilion to her head from a fragmented rock and made the Veer Lorik Stone as Sign of true love, to stand there forever.

== Veer Lorik Stone ==
Veer Lorik Stone
- Location: Markundi Hill, Sonbhadra district, Uttar Pradesh, India
- Nearest city: Robertsganj, Uttar Pradesh, India

Veer Lorik Stone, also known in Hindi as Veer Lorik Patthar (from veer 'brave', and patthar 'stone'), is situated around 5 km from Robertsganj on Markundi Hill, in the northern Indian state of Uttar Pradesh. It is a symbol of love and bravery of Lorik and Manjari, the main characters of the local folklore ‘Loriki’.

According to the folk tale, Veer Lorik cut this stone, using his sword, in a single stroke, as proof of his true love. Several folk songs, sung by native folksingers, are based on Loriki. Govardhan Puja, a Hindu festival, is celebrated here every year. During Govardhan Puja, many couples come here to pray for everlasting love, like that of Veer Lorik and Manjari.

=== Nearby locations ===
- Son View Point
- Salkhan Fossils Park

== Legacy ==
- Veer Lorik Statue, Bandihuli, Baheri (Darbhanga)
- In 1970, a caste-based militia named "Lorik Sena" was also established in Lorik's name and operated in Bihar.
- Veer Ahir, a 1924 Indian silent film directed by Homi Master.

== See also ==
- Veer Bantha Chamar
- Alha-Khand
- Agori Fort
- Sonbhadra
