= Mohammed Hanif Khan Shastri =

Indian Sanskrit scholar

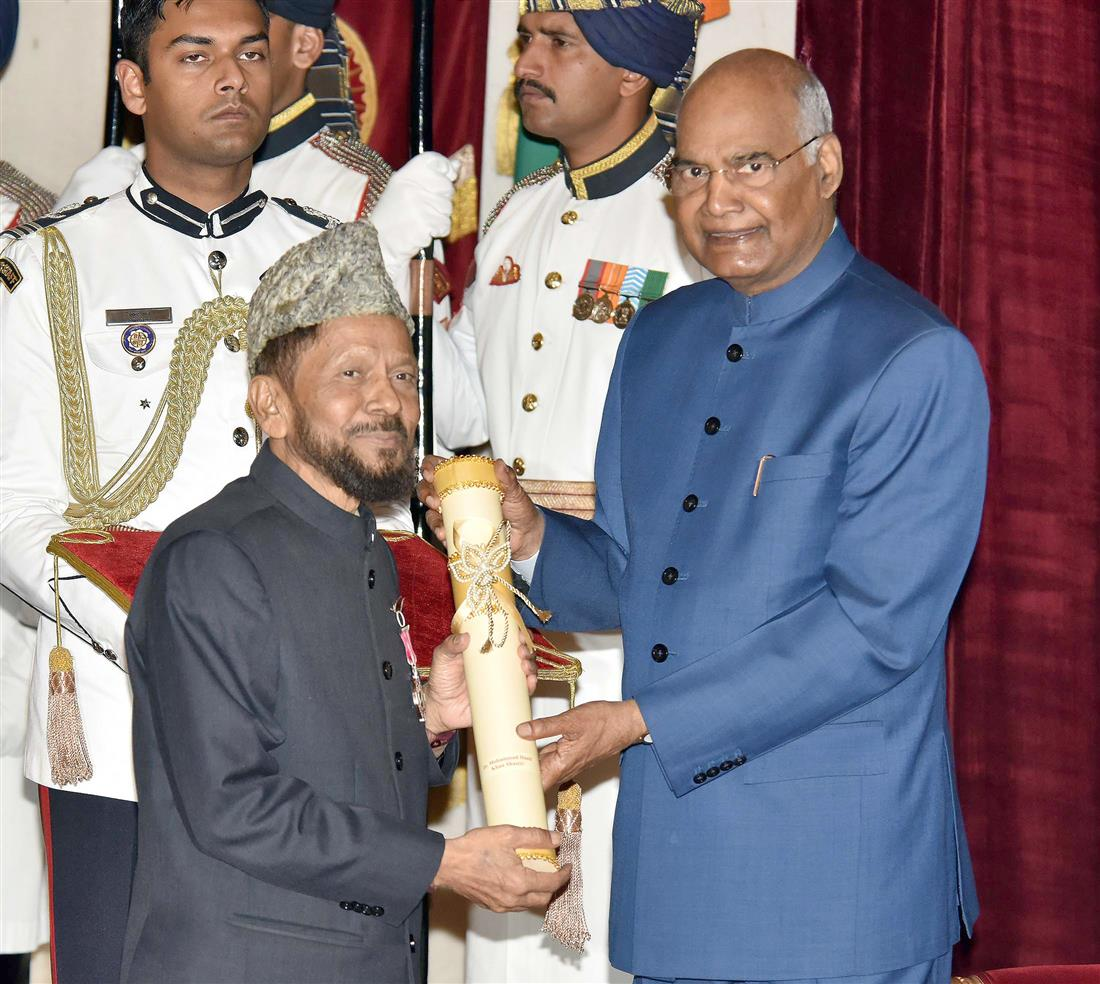
The President, Ram Nath Kovind presenting the Padma Shri Award to Mohammed Hanif Khan Shastri, at an Investiture Ceremony, at Rashtrapati Bhavan, in New Delhi on 16 March 2019

Mohammed Hanif Khan Shastri was an Indian Sanskrit scholar. He is the winner of National Communal Harmony Award, in the individual category for the year 2009. The Government of India awarded him fourth highest civilian award Padma Shri (Literature & Education) in 2019. He has been professor at Rashtriya Sanskrit Sansthan.

He died on 26 January 2020. He worked with a great enthusiasm in his last days, but due to prolonged illnesses and suffering from a weak body. He is known for his work in the field of religious literature.

== Early life ==
Khan Shastri was born in district Sonbhadra of Uttar Pradesh. In an interview to Doordarshan, he informs that he was the first of his family to pass 5th standard and thus the environment was not academically inclined. On his failure in high school, his teacher Pundit Ratanlal Shastri, urged him to study one chapter of the Bhagavad Gita every day, which would ensure god's benevolence and thus put an end to all his troubles. This exposure to the Bhagwad Gita, instilled in him a sense of curiosity about the secrets in the text, and the desire to share them with others. This desire led him to attempt to excel in Sanskrit, without which he couldn't see fruition of his goal of unravelling Bhagwad Gita's secrets.

== Academics ==
Khan Shastri has a MA in Sanskrit, subsequently he studied Puranas under Sampoorna Anand in Varanasi, and gained the degree of Acharya and Shastri and also a doctorate in Comparative Religion. His doctoral thesis was Mahamantra Gayatri Aur Surah Fatiah Ka Arth Prayog Evam Mahatmya Ki Drishtri Se Tulnatmak Adhyayan (Comparative analysis of Gayatri Mantra and Surah Fatiah, with reference to meaning and importance).

== Books ==
Amongst the eight books he has written are:

- Mohangita
- Geeta Aur Quran men Samanjasya
- Ved aur Quran se Mahamantra Gayatri aur Surah Fatiha
- Vedon men Manav Adhikar
- Meljol
- Mahamantra gayatree ka baudhik upyog
- Shreemadbhagwadgeeta aur quran
- Vishwabandhutva ka pratyachh pramad
