= Vandevi Temple, Renukoot =

Hindu Temple in Uttar Pradesh, India

Vandevi Temple
- वनदेवी धाम
- location of Vandevi Temple in Uttar Pradesh

Religion
- Affiliation: Hinduism
- Deity: Vandevi
- Festivals: Navratra, Sawan

Location
- Location: Sonbhadra
- State: Uttar Pradesh
- Country: India
- Coordinates: 24°12′25″N 83°0′0″E

Architecture
- Creator: Indian Government
- Completed: 1953

Website
- http://www.easternuptourism.com/?p=6817

Vandevi Dham, is the Temple of Vandevi and is located at a distance of about 6 km from Renukut, about 76 km from Robertsganj on Renukut-Shaktinagar Road, 1 km ahead of Rihand Dam in Sonbhadra district, Uttar Pradesh. The Vandevi temple is dedicated to Vandevi, the Goddess of forest.

== History and importance ==
The Idol installed in Vandevi Temple was excavated during the construction of Rihand Dam. Coconut and Chunari (headgear cloth) are offered to the main deity of the temple.

== How to reach ==
=== Road ===
Accessed from Robertsganj via Renukut-Shaktinagar through SH-5 & NH-75

=== Train ===
Renukut is well connected by rail to all the major cities.

=== Air ===
Babatpur Airport, Varanasi about 186 km.
