= Prithul Kumar =

Indian civil servant

Personal details
- Born: September 13, 1976 (age 50) Sonbhadra, Uttar Pradesh, India
- Education: IIT Kanpur
- Occupation: Civil servant

Prithul Kumar (born 13 September 1976) is an Indian civil servant. He is a 2000-batch officer of the Indian Railway Traffic Service (IRTS) and currently serves as the Joint Secretary (Broadcasting) in the Ministry of Information & Broadcasting (MIB), Government of India. He has been Joint Secretary (Films) as well as the Managing Director of the National Film Development Corporation (NFDC).

== Early life and education ==
Kumar was born on 13 September 1976 in Sonbhadra, Uttar Pradesh. He earned a B.Tech in Civil Engineering from the IIT Kanpur.

== Career ==
Kumar is a 2000-batch officer of the Indian Railway Traffic Service. He has previously held roles, including Joint Secretary, Ministry of I&B, Member-Prasar Bharti Board, Managing Director of NFDC, Director (Mines) in the Ministry of Mines, and Executive Director (IT) in the Ministry of Railways.

In August 2022, he was appointed as Joint Secretary (Films) in the Ministry of Information & Broadcasting for a five-year term, and was also given additional charge as Managing Director of NFDC. He also serves as a nominated member of the Prasar Bharati Board.

As Joint Secretary (Films), Kumar oversees the Film Facilitation Office, film certification, production, archival, and film education policies. He was also involved in conceptualising the government’s media and entertainment vision under the initiative "WAVES 2025".
