= Son View Point =

Park in Robertsganj, India

- Eco Point Robertsganj
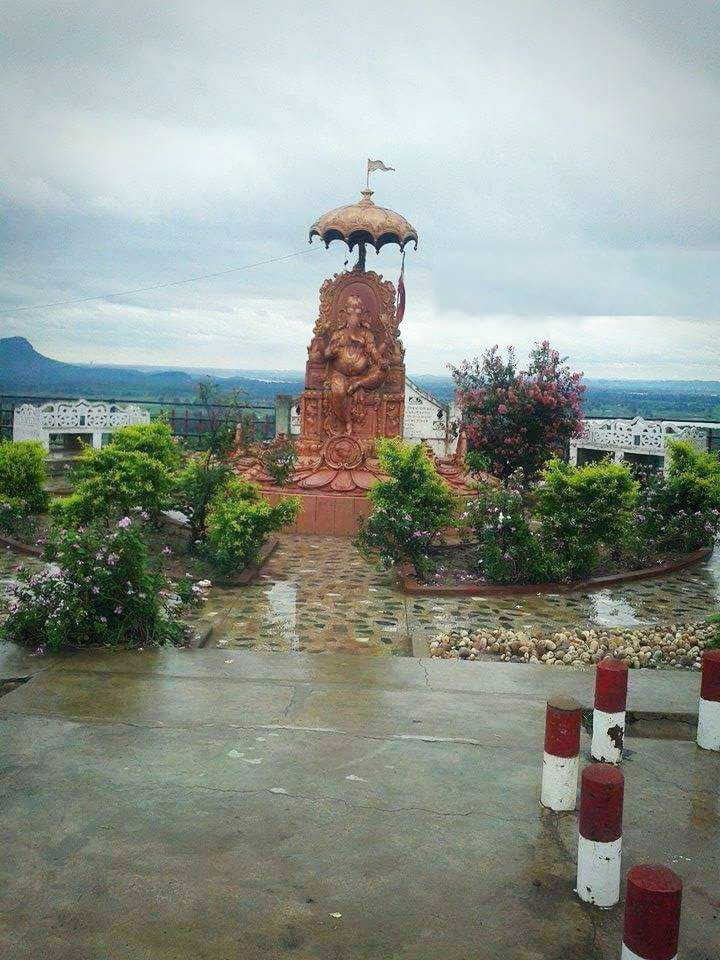
- Son View Point in Robertsganj

- Location within Uttar Pradesh
- Type: Eco park
- Location: Robertsganj, India
- Nearest city: Robertsganj and Churk
- Coordinates: 24°37′15″N 83°3′1″E
- Elevation: 300 m (980 ft)
- Created: 11 August 2003
- Founder: DM
- Operator: Hindalco Industrial Limited
- Status: Open all year

Son View Point, also known as Eco Point Robertsganj, is an Eco Garden in Sonbhadra district, India. The panoramic view of Son Valley is best witnessed from this point. It is about 6 km from Robertsganj, and hundred meters from Veer Lorik Stone, on Markundi Hill. Eco Point Robertsganj was inaugurated on 11 August 2003 by the District Magistrate of Sonbhadra. The place is thronged by tourists during the monsoon season as it provides a view of the valley, including small rainy waterfalls that mushroom during the season. A small restaurant close by provides fast food items. Son View Point is a picnic spot.

== Nearby ==
- Veer Lorik Stone
- Salkhan Fossils Park
