= Shivdwar =

Hindu Temple in Uttar Pradesh, India

Shivdwar शिवद्वार
- Uma Maheshwar Temple उमा महेश्वर मन्दिर
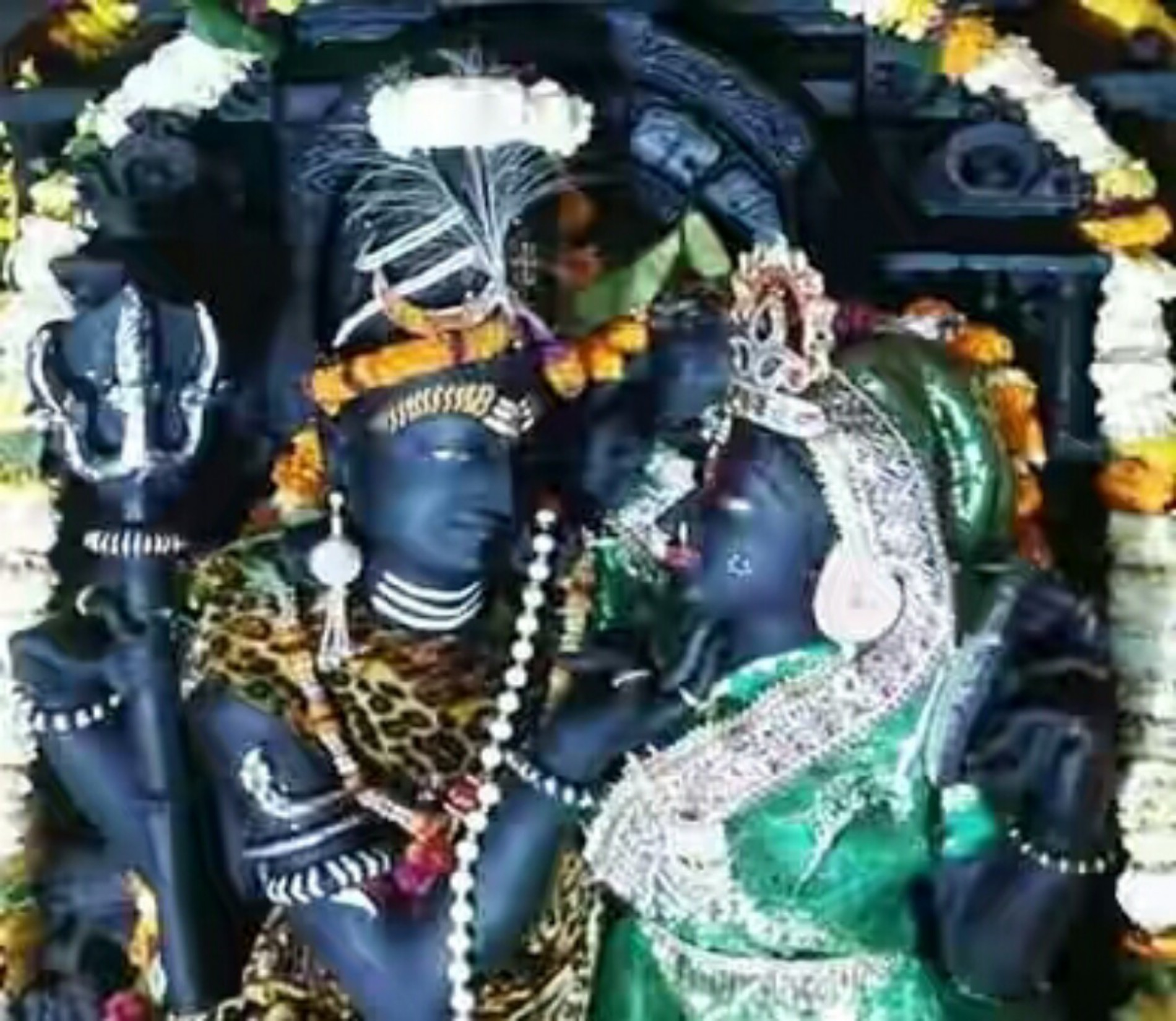
- Uma Maheshwar in Shivdwar Temple

Religion
- Affiliation: Hinduism
- Deity: Uma Maheshwar
- Festivals: Shravan, shivratri

Location
- Location: Shivdwar, Sonbhadra
- State: Uttar Pradesh
- Country: India

Architecture
- Type: Black stone 3 feet statue using Lashya style
- Completed: 11th Century

Website
- http://sonbhadra.nic.in/Shivdwar.aspx

Shivdwar, officially known as Uma Maheshwar Temple, is located 10 km from Ghorawal in Sonbhadra district, Uttar Pradesh. The Shivdwar temple is dedicated to Shiva and Goddess Parvati, and was built in the 11th Century. It is said that this is the only idol of Lord Shiva in this world where sacred water is offered to statue not to the lingam.

== Structure and uniqueness ==
The statue is made of black stone which is three feet high in the Lashya Style.

== History ==
Mythology Recognize that because of ego Daksha Prajapati was not invited to the ritual Dewadidev Shiva by the humiliation of husband Sati to destroy the ego of the father abandoned his body. This angered Shiva. He originated Veerbhadra from his coma and ordered the slaughter of Prajapati Daksha . Prajapati was killed by Veerbhadra. After convincing the gods Shiva the Creator placed the severed head of the goat in place of head on the Prajapati. After destroying the ego of Prajapati Daksha lord Shiva moved there from a very depressed mood. Shiva then turned to say Sonbhumi. The Shiv stepped agori area. Shiva holds in the region where the first stage, it is known as today Shivdwar. Here he became agori baba and he decided to exile. Due to Shiva's secret hiding place this place is known as Gupt kashi or Second Kashi.

== Importance ==
In the temple at the time of festivals of Shravan, Basant Panchami, Shivaratri there are huge crowds of devotees. In month of Shravan, many Kanwarias bring holy water from the Mirzapur Ganges or from Ram Sagar which is situated in Vijaygarh Fort and offer the water at this temple to the deity.
