= Dudhi =

Dudhi Duddhi
- Town
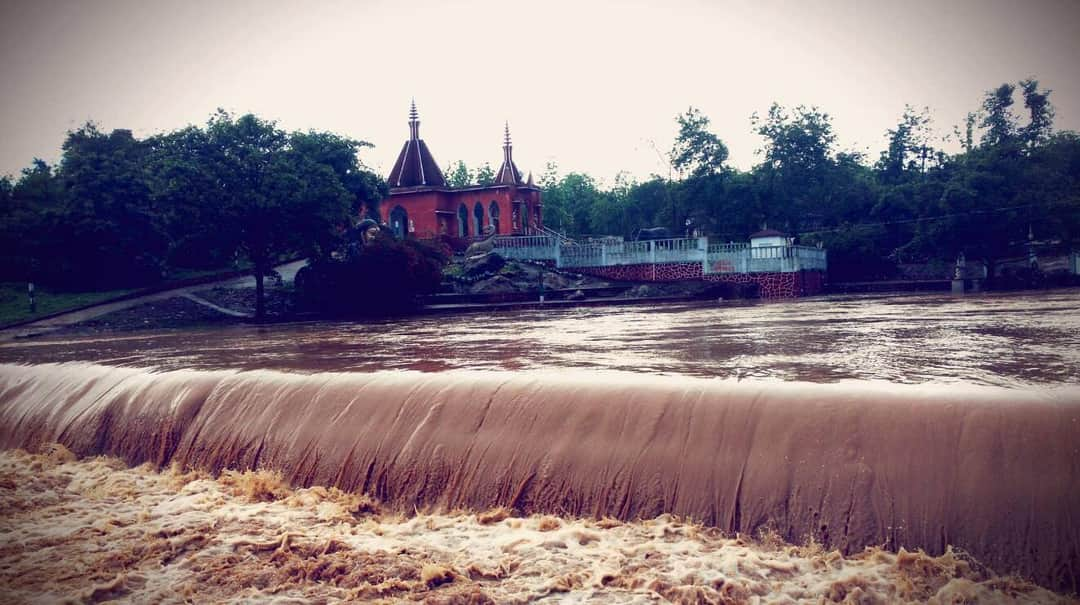
- Lavkush temple situated in Dudhi town on the bank of Lauaa river

- Location in Uttar Pradesh, India
- Coordinates: 24.22°N 83.25°E
- Country: India
- State: Uttar Pradesh
- District: Sonbhadra

Population (Census of India 2011)
  - Total: 159,001

Languages
  - Official: Hindi, Bhojpuri
- Time zone: UTC+5:30 (IST)
- Postal code: 231208

Dudhi or Duddhi is a town and nagar panchayat in Sonbhadra district in the state of Uttar Pradesh, India. It belongs to Mirzapur Division. It is located 64 km south of the district capital, Robertsganj. Dudhi is a tehsil of Sonebhadra district. Renukoot, Anpara, Obra, and Robertsganj are the closest cities to Dudhi.

== Demographics ==
As of 2011 India census, Dudhi tehsil had a population of 159,001 and Dudhi town had a population of 12,560. Males constitute 54% of the population and females 46%. Duddhi has an average literacy rate of 67%. Male literacy is 74%, and female literacy is 58%. In Duddhi, 17% of the population is under 6 years of age.

== Transport ==
=== Air ===
Duddhi is located about 154 km from the city of Varanasi, which has also the nearest airport. Flights are available to all major Indian cities.

=== Rail ===
The Duddhinagar railway station connects Delhi, Jammu, Allahabad, Ranchi, Tatanagar, Lucknow, Bareilly, Kolkata and Kanpur by rail. Some notable trains passing through the town are:

- Muri Express (Jammu Tawi - Delhi - Tata Nagar)
- Triveni Express (Bareilly - Lucknow - Shaktinagar)
- Singrauli - Patna Link Express (Singrauli - Patna)
- Shaktipunj Express (Howrah - Jabalpur)

=== Road ===
Duddhi is well connected to Renukoot, Robertsganj, Varanasi and Mirzapur by road. Buses are available at all hours of the day from Hathinala to connect with other nearest cities.
