= Vijaygarh Fort =

Historic fort in Uttar Pradesh, India

- Sonbhadra district, Uttar Pradesh, India

Site information
- Type: Hill fort
- Owner: Government of Uttar Pradesh
- Open to the public: Yes
- Condition: Ruins

Location
- Coordinates: 24.577708°N 83.180845°E

Vijaygarh Fort is a historic hill fort located near Mau Kalan village in the Chatra block of Sonbhadra district, Uttar Pradesh, India. The fort is situated approximately 30 kilometres southeast of Robertsganj near the Dhandhraul Dam on the Chatra–Siltham road. Located within the rugged terrain of the Kaimur Range, the fort is known for its archaeological remains, rock inscriptions, perennial ponds, temples, cave paintings, and its association with the Hindi fantasy novel Chandrakanta by Devaki Nandan Khatri.

== History ==
The exact date of construction of Vijaygarh Fort is uncertain. Archaeological remains and inscriptions found in the region suggest that the site has been inhabited since ancient times.

The fort later came under the control of the rulers of the Benares State and served as an important stronghold in the southeastern territories of the kingdom. Historical accounts state that Maharaja Balwant Singh of Benares captured the fort in the eighteenth century after defeating Mughal-aligned forces in the region.

Kashi Naresh Maharaja Chet Singh was the last Indian ruler of this fort till the arrival of Britishers. During the British colonial period, the Vijaygarh estate functioned as a zamindari comprising several villages in the surrounding region. Historical records mention that the Vijaygarh Raj controlled approximately 350 villages.

== Architecture ==
Vijaygarh Fort is spread across a hilly plateau and contains remnants of defensive walls, gateways, temples, rock-cut structures, reservoirs, and carved stone pillars. The surrounding hills of the Kaimur Range provided strategic defensive advantages to the fort.

The fort contains four perennial ponds which reportedly never dry up throughout the year. Among the notable structures inside the fort complex is the Rang Mahal, traditionally associated with Princess Chandrakanta. The structure is known for decorative carvings and remains of palace architecture.

== Archaeological significance ==
The fort is known for its archaeological remains including rock inscriptions, cave paintings, sculptures, and carved pillars. Some inscriptions found within the fort complex are associated with feudatories linked to the Gupta period, although detailed scholarly studies remain limited.

Vijaygarh Fort is considered historically and archaeologically significant for understanding the regional history of southeastern Uttar Pradesh.

== Religious and cultural significance ==
A shrine dedicated to Syed Miran Shah Baba is located within the fort complex. An annual Urs fair is organised every April and is attended by people from different religious communities.

During the Hindu month of Shravana, Kanwariyas collect holy water from Ram Sagar near the fort before beginning their pilgrimage to Shivdwar, a regional Shiva shrine.

== In popular culture ==
Vijaygarh Fort is associated with the Hindi fantasy novel Chandrakanta written by Devaki Nandan Khatri. The fort and its surrounding landscape are believed to have inspired elements of the fictional setting described in the novel.

== Tourism ==
The fort attracts tourists, trekkers, historians, and archaeology enthusiasts due to its scenic surroundings, ancient ruins, and literary significance. The nearby Dhandhraul Dam and the Kaimur hills further enhance the area's tourism appeal.

== See also ==
- Sonbhadra district
- Robertsganj
- Benares State
- Ramnagar Fort
- Chandrakanta (novel)

== History ==
The Vijaygarh Fort was ruled the Kashi Naresh of Banaras State. The Maharaja of Ramnagar fort were controlling the fort till arrival of Britishers. In year 1747, Kashi Naresh Maharaja Balwant Singh had captured the fort after defeating Mughal forces. The fort was under control of Kashi Naresh till the arrival of Britishers. Britishers had restored as a form of zamindari to their supporters a chandel family of Vijaygarh area. During the British period in India, the Vijaygarh Raj had 350 villages under they control.

== Attractions ==
Vijaygarh Fort contains several old temples and red stone pillars bearing inscriptions of Vishnuverdhan feudatory of Samudragupta. The fort is famous for its rock inscriptions, cave paintings, many statues and its perennial ponds. There are four ponds inside the premises of the fort which never dry. More than half the area of Vijargarh is covered by the steep and rugged hills of the Kaimur Range. Between the two tanks, there was a palace known as Rang Mahal (Hindi: रंग महल) which had artistic rock carvings and assumed as palace of Princess Chandrakanta.

There is a fair (Urs) of Syed Miran Shah Baba his majaar situated in the fort fair organized every April, and people from muhmdon and different religions and sects attend.

Vijaygarh Fort has both historical and archaeological importance. The fort and Princess Chandrakanta were pertinently described in the novel Chandrakanta by Devaki Nandan Khatri

In the Hindu month of Shravana, Kānvarias (Kanwar Yatra) collect water from Ram Sagar and then start their holy journey to the Shivdwar.

== Gallery ==
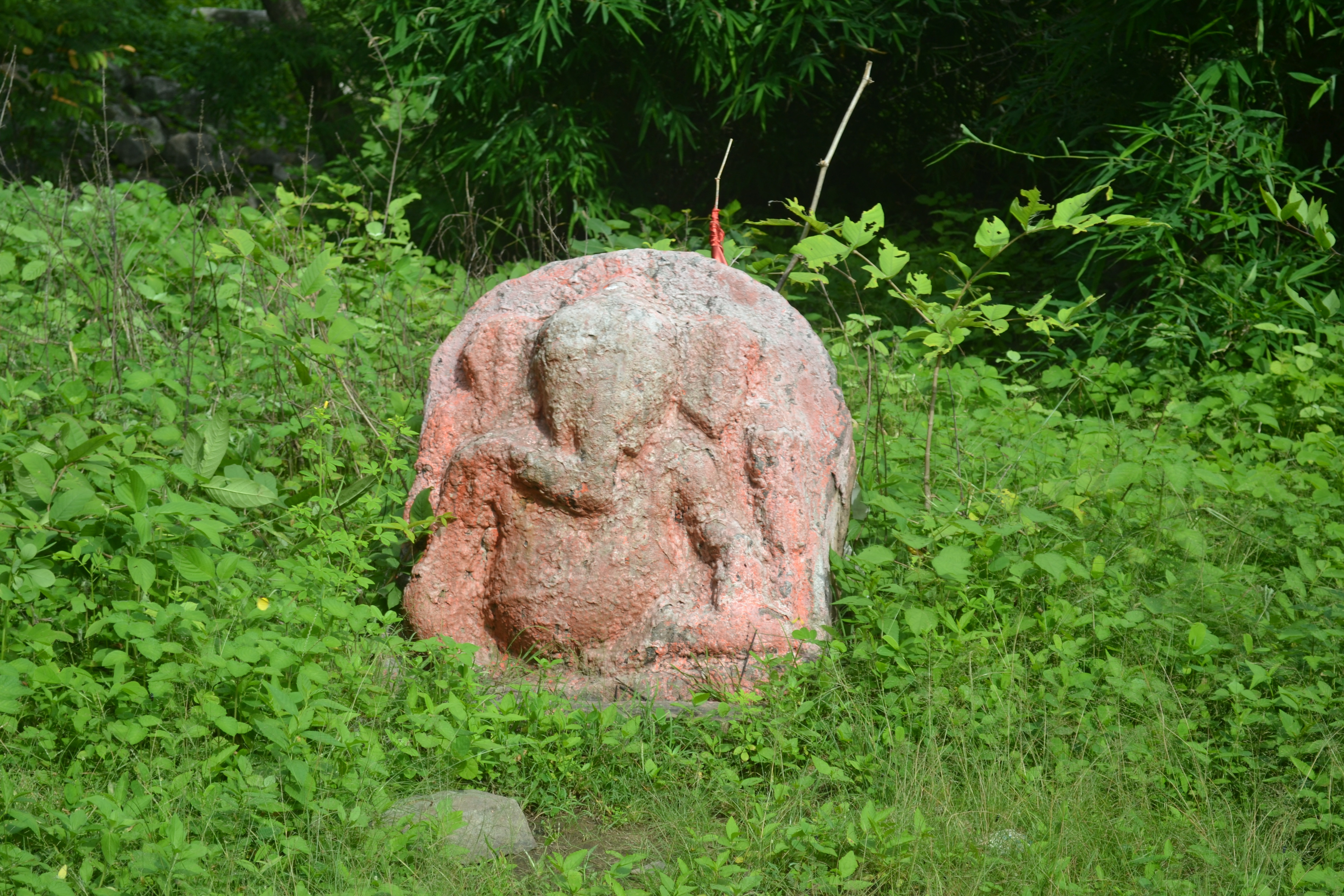
Ganesha statue at Vijay Garh Fort

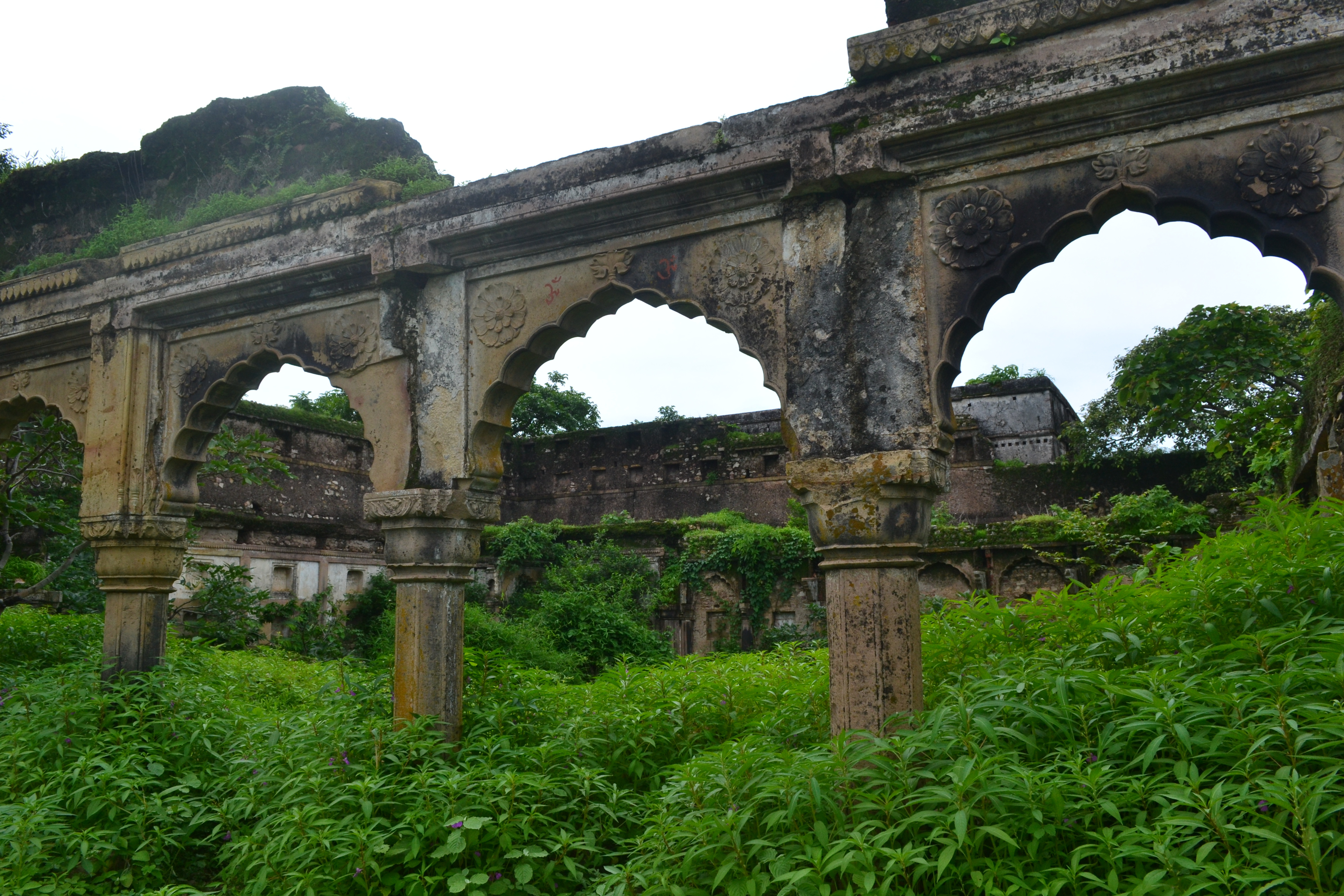
Entrance at a ruined building at Vijay Garh Fort

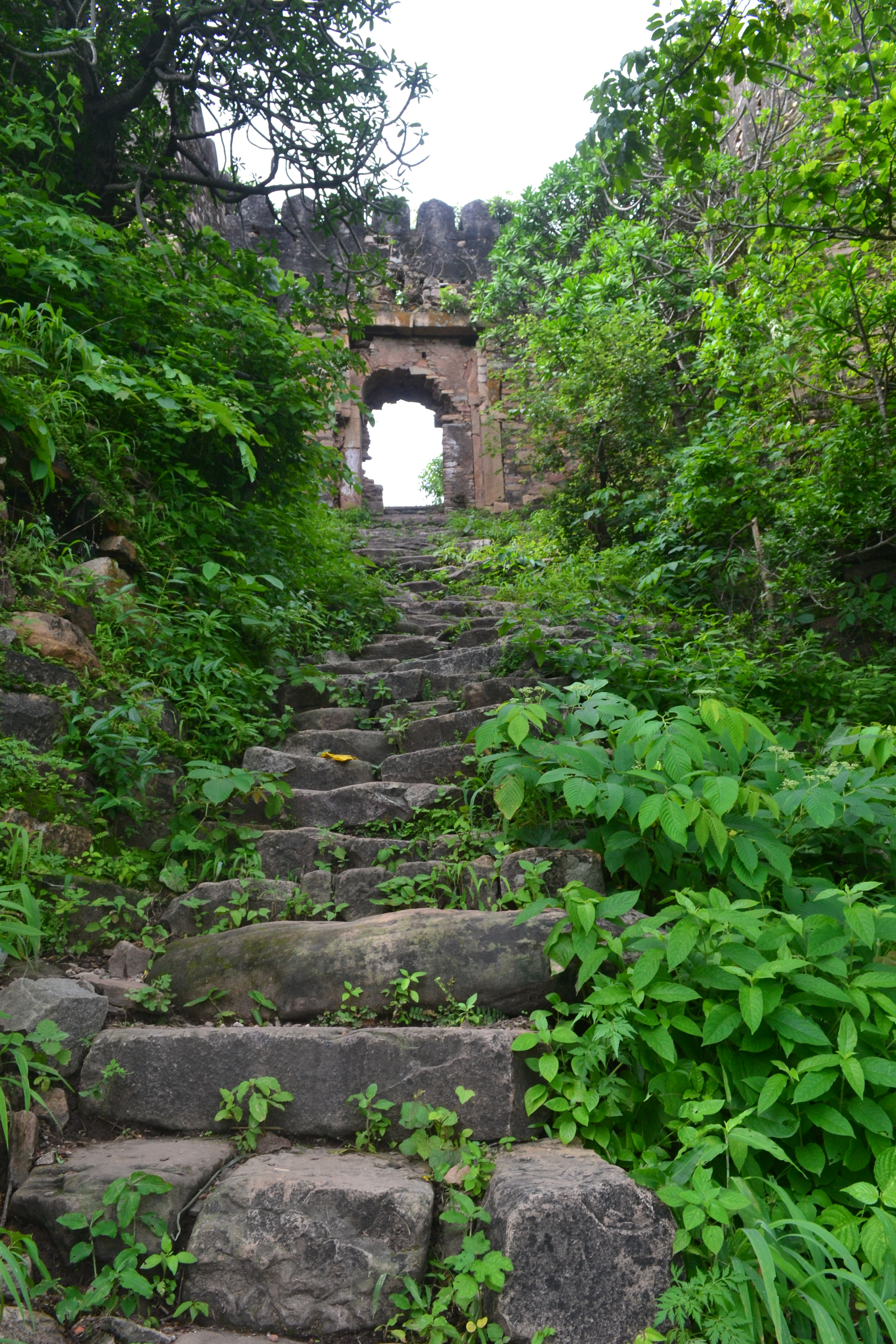
Entrance of Vijay Garh Fort

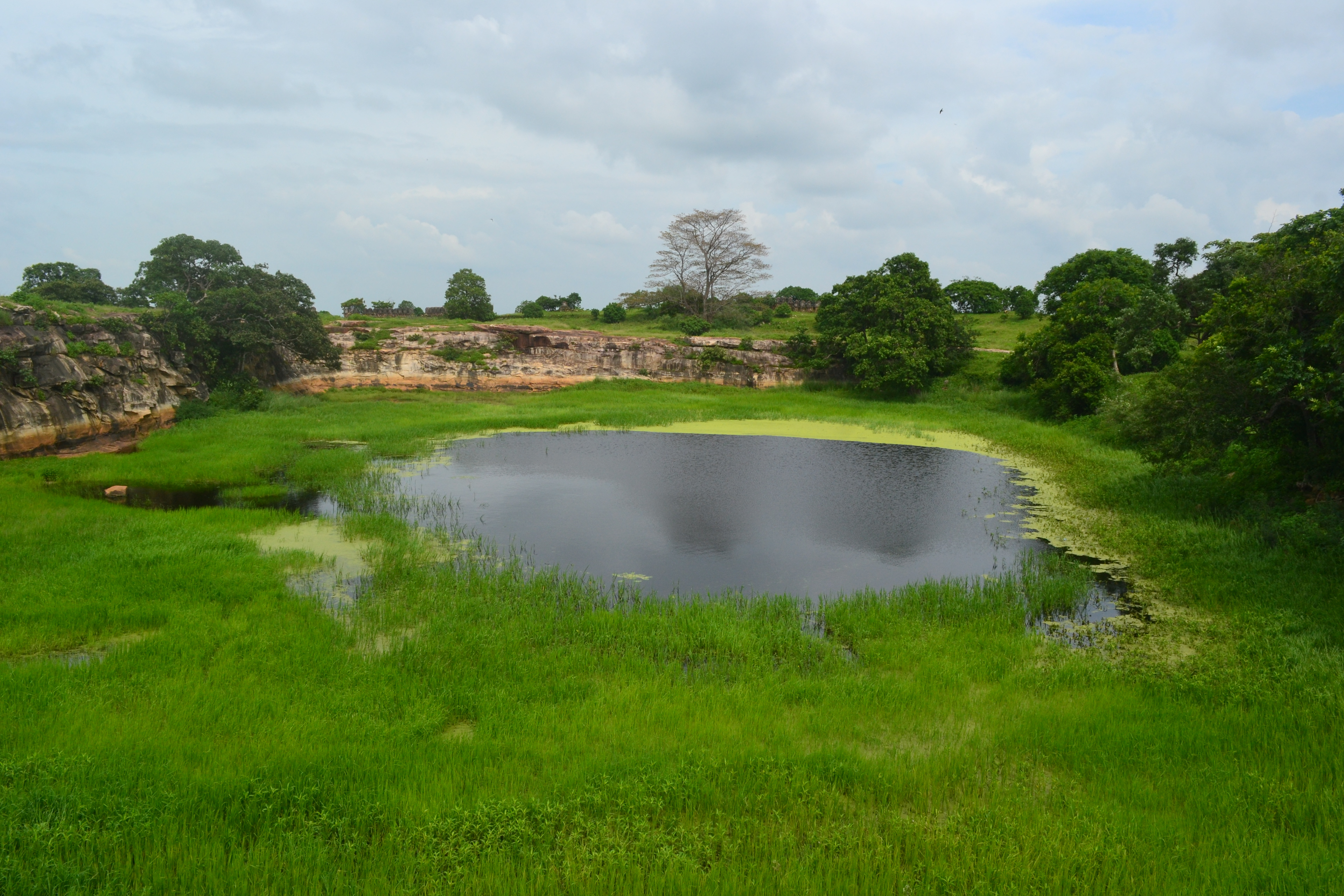
Lake 1 on Vijay Garh Fort

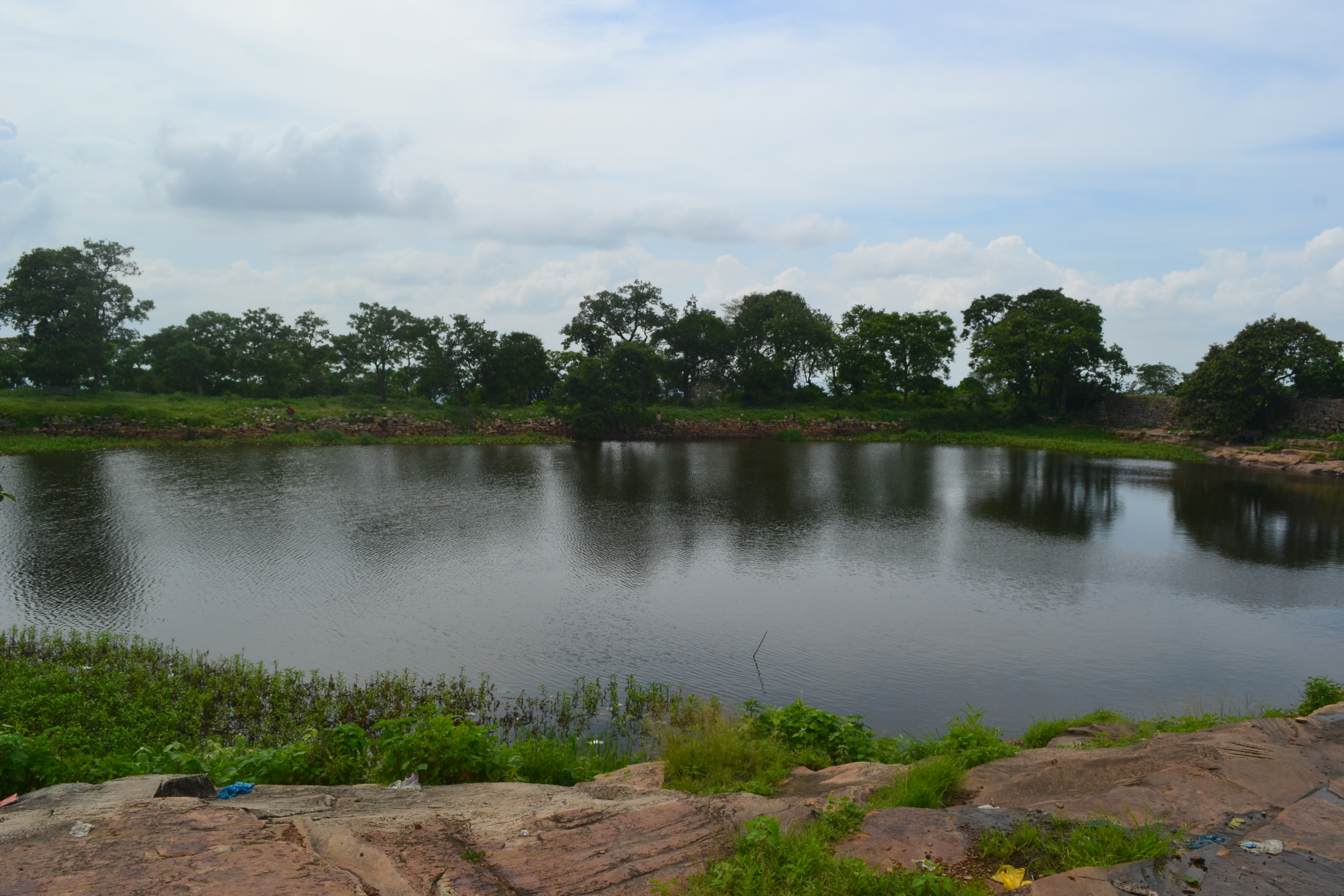
Lake 2 on Vijay Garh Fort

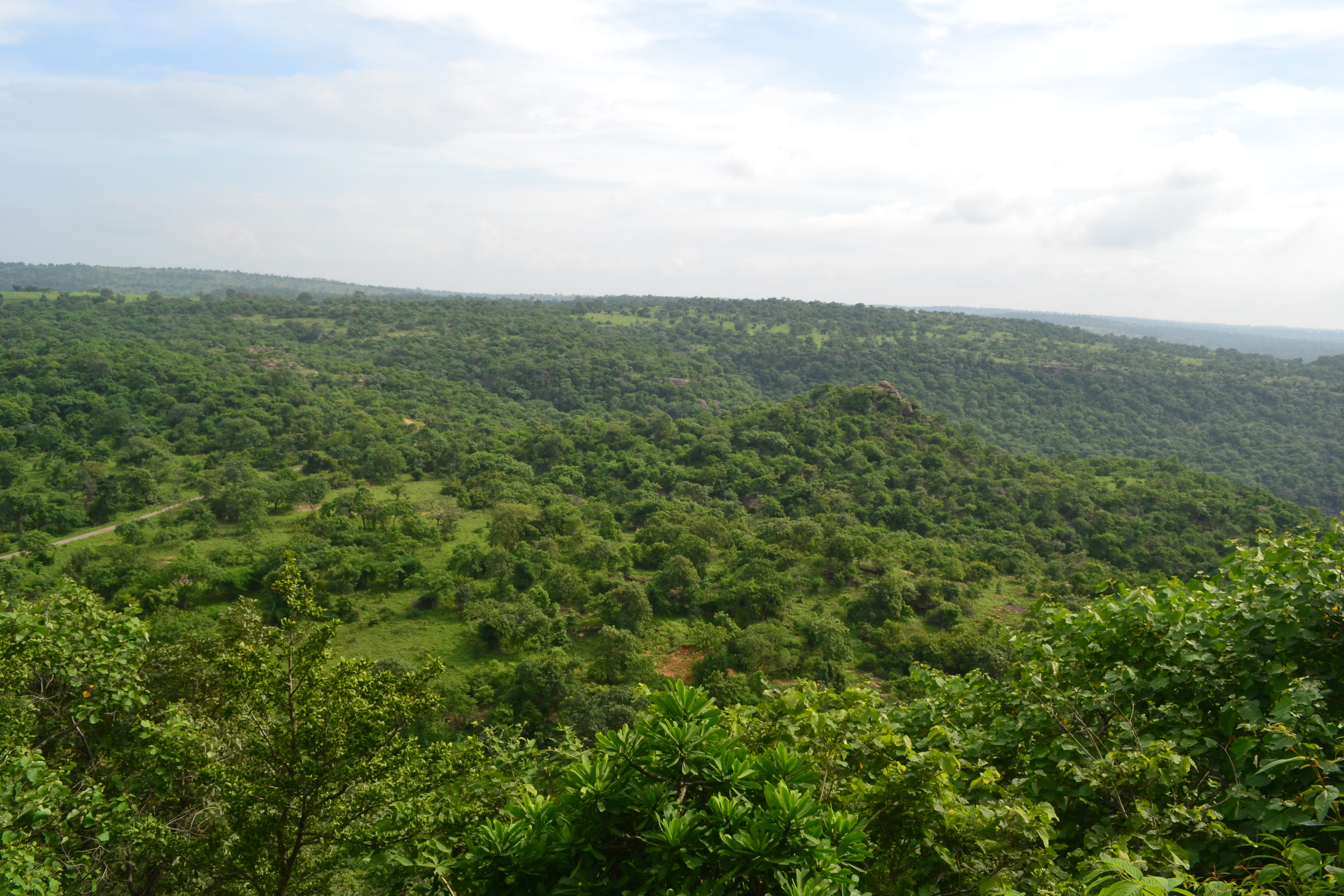
View from the top of Vijay Garh Fort

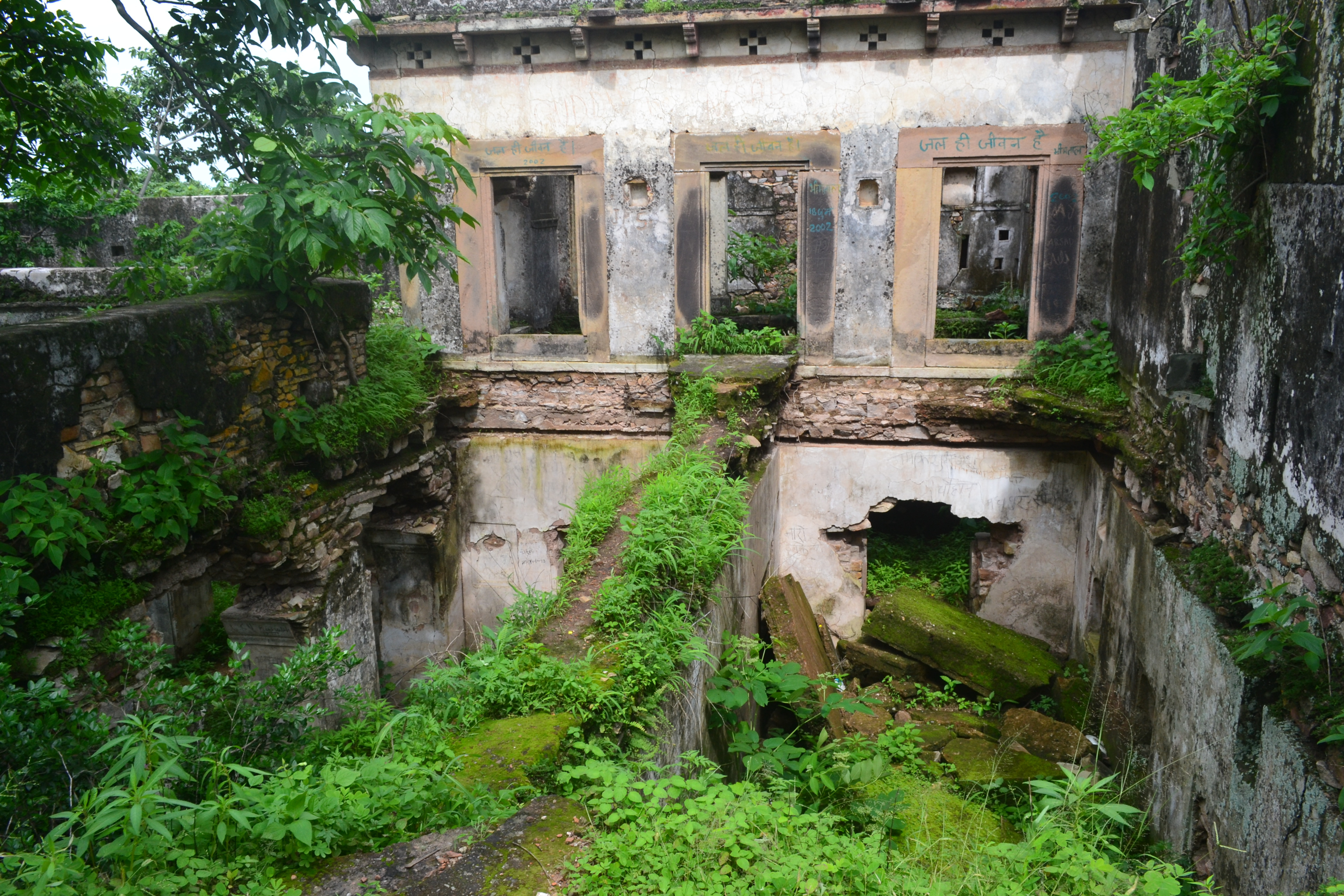
Ruined Building at Vijayagarh Fort

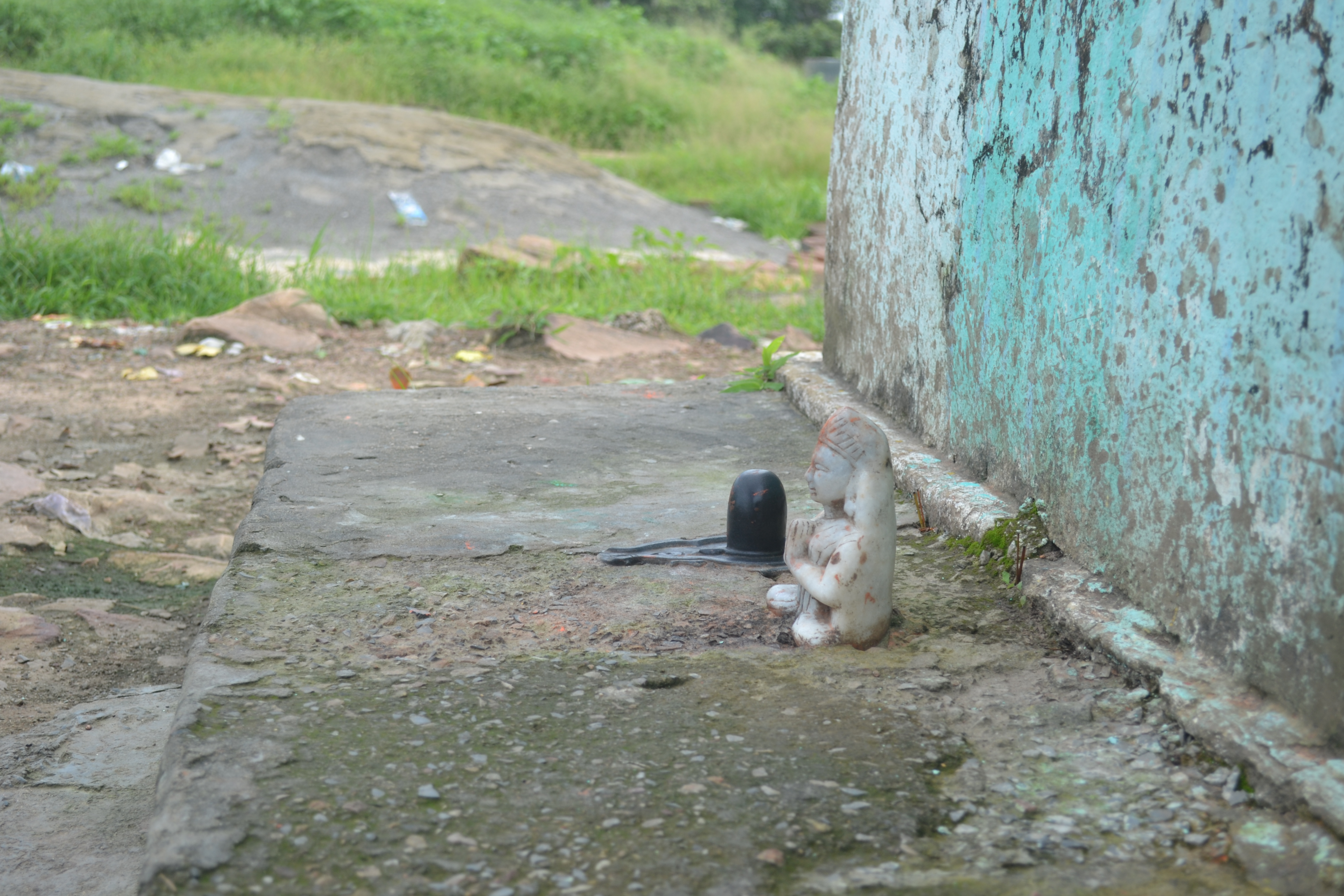
Shivalingam and Goddess Parvati's Statue at fort

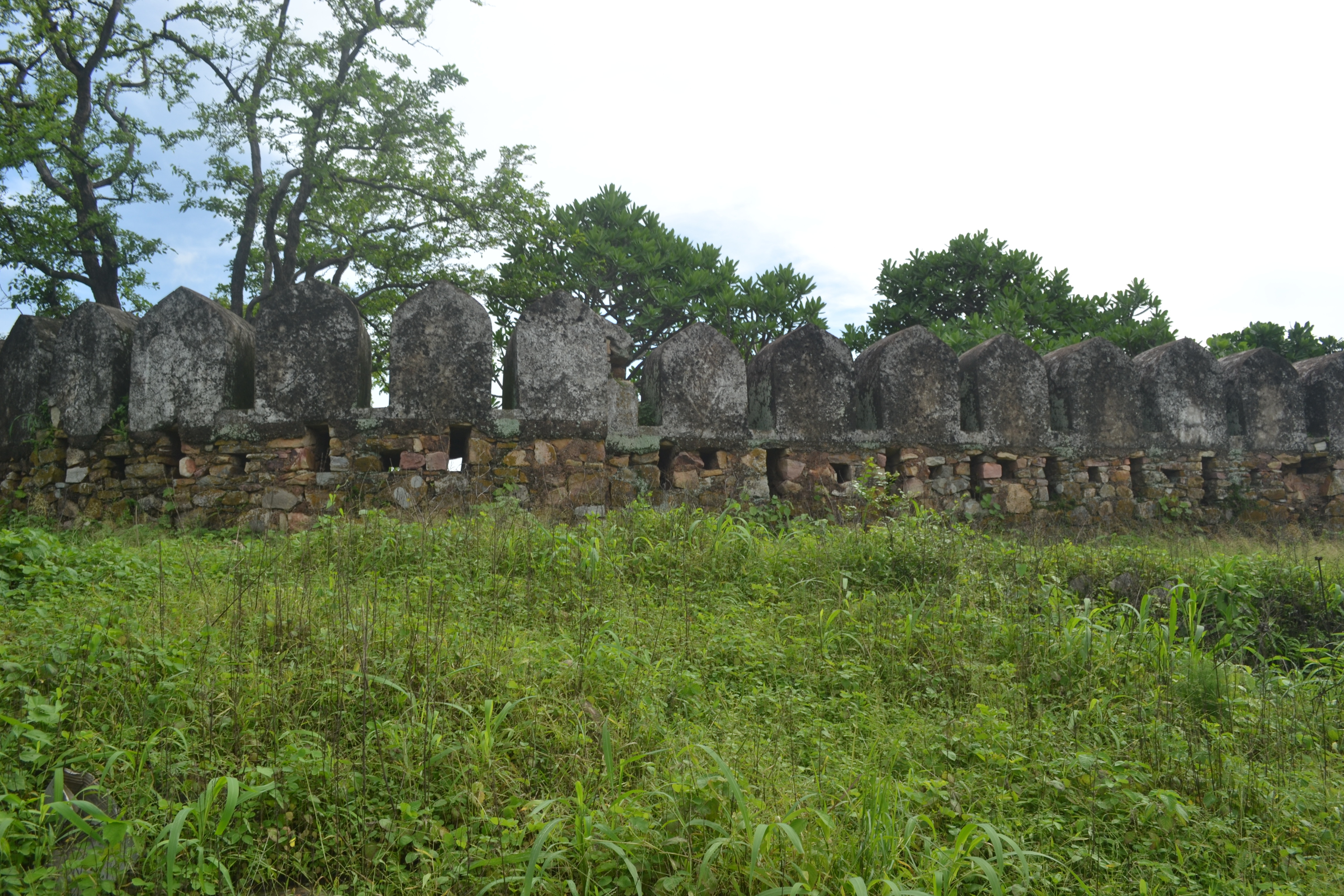
Walls of Vijaygarh Fort

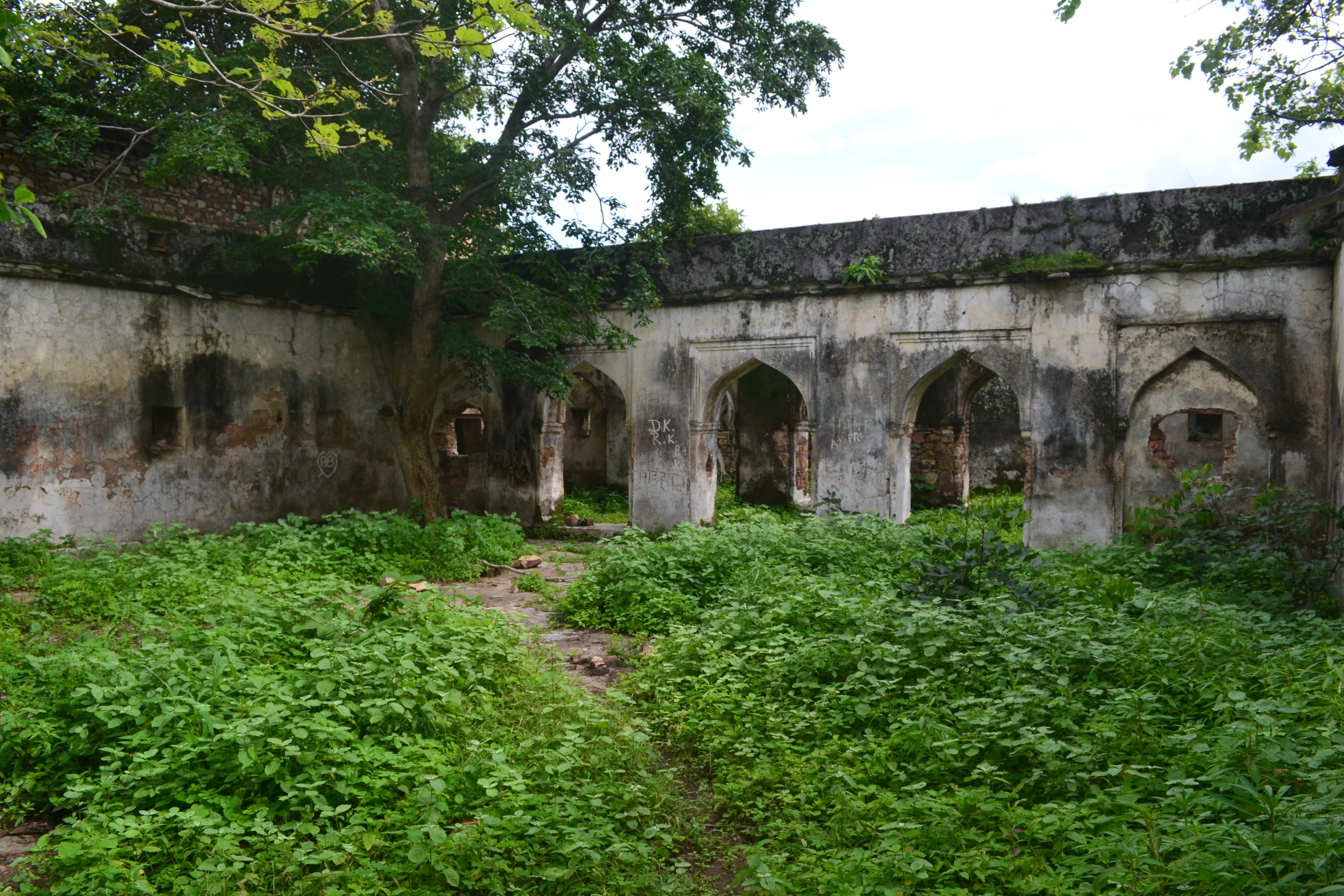
Broken rooms at Fort

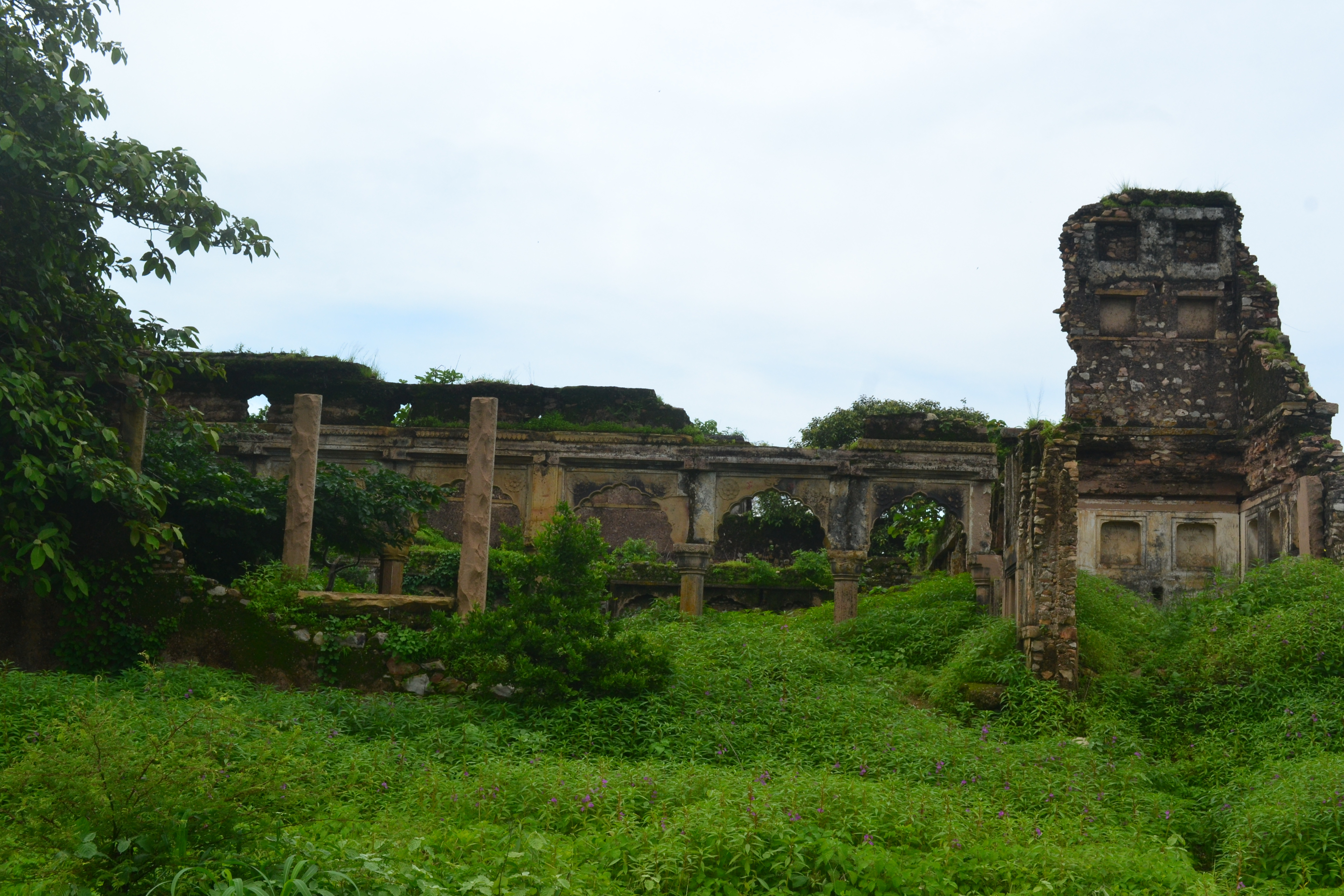
Ruined building complex

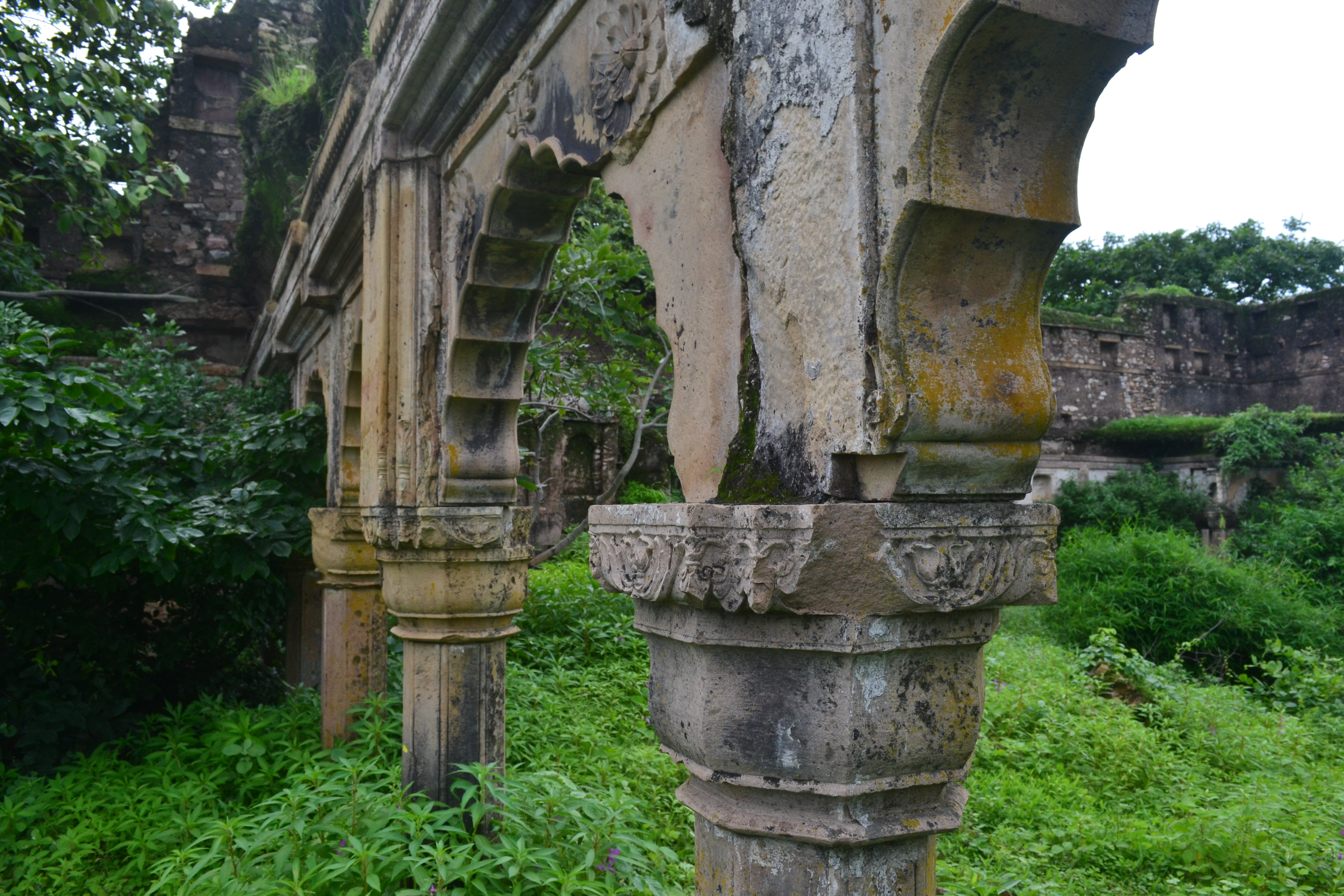
Pillars of ruined building at Vijaygarh Fort

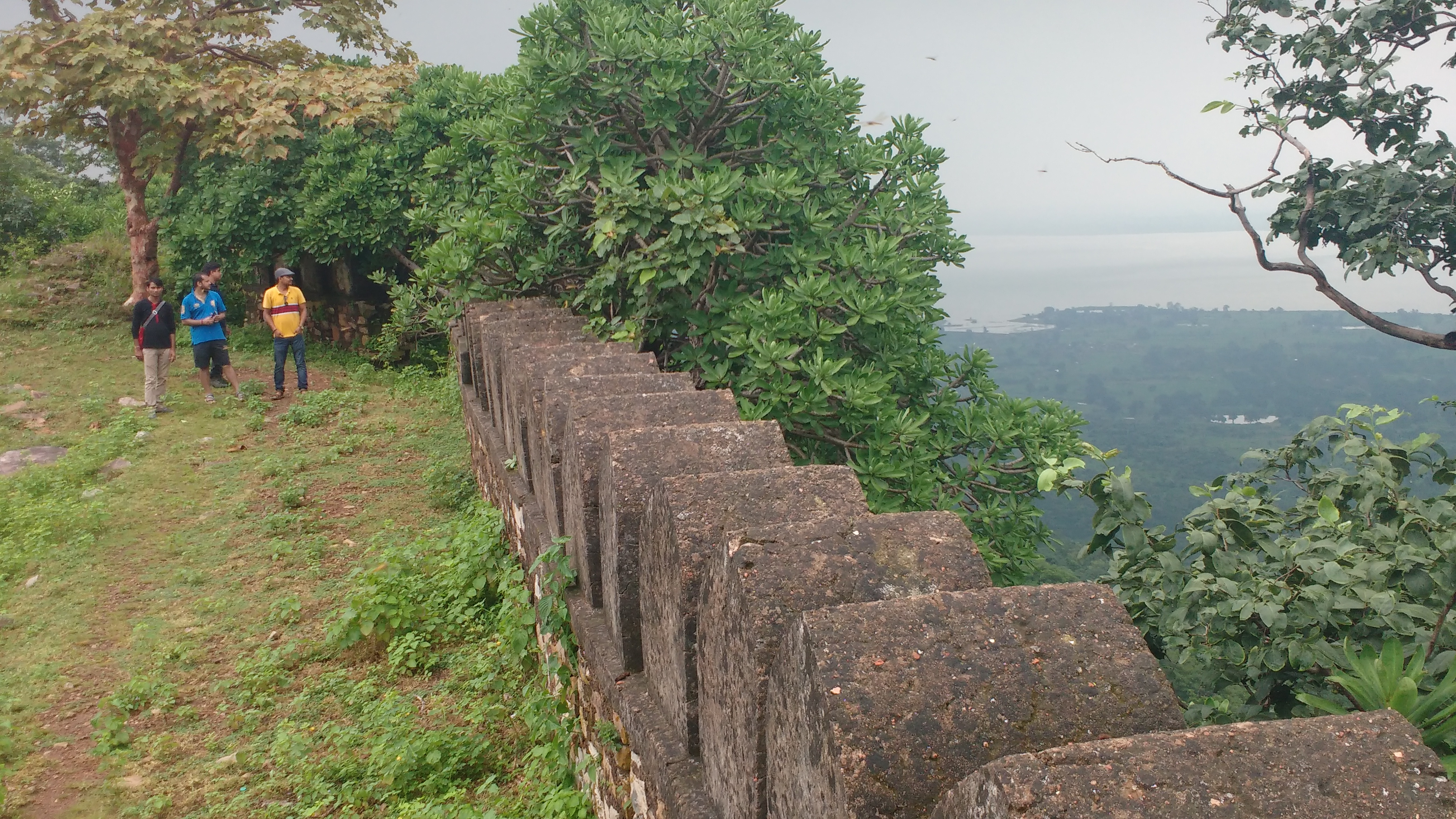
Wall of Fort and Dhanraul Dam in background

== See also ==
- List of forts in Uttar Pradesh
- Chandrakanta a novel by Devaki Nandan Khatri
