= Obra, Uttar Pradesh =

Obra
- Town
- Location in Uttar Pradesh, India Obra (India)
- Coordinates: 24.42°N 82.98°E
- Country: India
- State: Uttar Pradesh
- District: Sonebhadra

Population (2011)
  - Total: 46,574

Languages
  - Official: Hindi
- Time zone: UTC+5:30 (IST)
- PIN: 231219
- Telephone code: 05445
- Vehicle registration: UP-64
- Website: sonbhadra.nic.in/default1.aspx

Obra is a town, Tehsil, and Assembly constituency of the Indian state of Uttar Pradesh. It is located in the Sonebhadra district. It has been upgraded from the stature of Nagar Panchayat, and was previously a part of the Mirzapur District. Obra is located 137 km from Varanasi at the Banks of Renu & Sone River with population of 46,574 as per the 2011 India Census. State-owned UPRVUNL and UPJVUNL have a coal-fired thermal power plant and a hydroelectric power plant in Obra, respectively. The thermal and hydroelectric power industries are the major source of employment, either directly or indirectly . Obra is not very well connected by rail. The nearest railway station is Chopan, which is about 10 kilometers from Obra, and has connectivity to other major cities of India. Recreational places in Obra include Jawahar Bal Udayan (Children's Park), Ambedkar Stadium, Lord Shiva's temple, Sone river banks, and Parsoi and Kharatiya villages. Restructuring of government residential colony is ongoing (as of 2020) as new power plants are being constructed.

== Geography ==
Obra is located at 24.42°N 82.98°E. It has an average elevation in the range of 315 and 485 metres.

== Demographics ==
As of 2011 India census, Obra had a 406,574 of which 204,804 are males while 201,770 are females as per report released by Census India 2011. Obra has an average literacy rate of 87%, higher than the state average of 67.68%: male literacy is around 91.5%, and female literacy is 86.9%. In Obra, 12.36% of the population is under 6 years of age.

== Power stations ==
Obra stands by the side of the Renu & Sone rivers, tributaries of the Ganga. The environment around nicely supports the Thermal and Hydroelectric (Hydel) Power Station. The thermal station has 13 units with the total capacity of 1550 MW and the Hydel has a maximum capacity of 99 MW. Thermal power station-B houses India's first 200 MW installed and commissioned units. Pushing aside heavy competition from home-bred companies like BHEL and L&T, South Korea's top power equipment manufacturer Doosan Heavy Industries & Construction Company's Indian arm, Doosan Power Systems India (DPSI), clinched two super-critical power projects of 1,320 MW each in Uttar Pradesh. the 2×660 MW Obra C project, in Sonebhadra district, would be a brownfield project and will cost R10,416 crore. The construction is now underway. Both the projects are expected to start generating 1320 MW of power each by 2021.

== Economy ==
Apart from the power plants, stone-crushing and transportation are major employment providers . Retail shops also form a chunk of the economy.

== Media and communications ==
All India Radio has a local station in Obra, which broadcasts mainly in Hindi and Bhojpuri. The station started on 28.08.1993. It operates on 102.7 MHz.

== Schools and Colleges and coaching ==
1. BHABHA COACHING CLASSES run by well acclaimed Chemistry teacher Mr.OP SINGH.
2. Rajkiya Snatakottar Mahavidyalaya (Obra Degree College)
3. Vidya Niketan Junior High School Sector-10
4. Sacred Heart Convent School
5. Obra Inter College
6. Kiddies Care English School
7. Shishu Shiksha Niketan
8. Saraswati Shishu Mandir
9. Career Convent educational school
10. Bal Vidya Mandir
11. Shiksha Niketan Intermediate College
12. Modern Convent School
13. Swami Satyananda Saraswati Vidyalaya
14. Girls Inter College
15. Saraswati Vidya Mandir
16. Islamia School
17. Islamia Inter College
18. Atmaram Pvt ITI Gajraj Nagar, Chopan Road, Obra
19. DAV Public School
20. Vijay ITI
21. om coaching center sector 8 obra
22. English medium School, Govt.School, Billi Gav
23. Vikash coaching center khairatiya

== Religious places ==
1. Sharda Mandir Chopan Road
2. Hanuman Mandir, at junction of Chopan Road and VIP Road
3. Maa Sheetla Mandir, Chopan Road
4. gaytri mandir sec-8
5. Someswar Mahadev Mandir, Bhalua Tola
6. Shiv Mandir, Sector 10
7. Islamia Mosque, VIP Road
8. Sacred Heart Church, VIP Road
9. Sankat Mochan Mandir, Sector 2
10. Baba Bhuteshwar Darbar Cave, Sector 3
11. Buddha Vihar, Ambedkar Chauraha
12. Chitra Gupta Mandir, Ram Mandir Colony
13. Gurdwara Singh Sabha, Obra Sonebhadra
14. Noori Maszid, Bhalua Tola
15. Millat Nagar Mosque
16. St.Luke's Church, sector-8
17. Shiv Parvati Amar Gufa, Salaibanwa
18. Geeta mandir, sector 8
19. Madina Mosque, bhalua tola

== Places to visit ==
- Jawahar Bal Udyaan (Children Park), VIP Road
- Water Treatment Plant, Sector 3
- Obra Dam
- Water Treatment Plant, Sector 10
- Ambedkar Stadium, Near Degree College
- Gandhi Maidan
- Sector 10 Hill
- Devil Garden

== Notable people ==
- Anurag Kashyap
- Abhinav Kashyap
- Film writer Haider Rizvi, written famous Indian comedy shows like The great Indian Laughter Challenge, the feature film Siya and Rajkumar rao starrer film Bhool Chuk Maaf .
