= Chopan =

- Town
- Location in Uttar Pradesh, India
- Coordinates: 24.52°N 83.03°E
- Country: India
- State: Uttar Pradesh
- District: Sonbhadra

Government
  - Type: Chopan Nagar Panchayat
- Elevation: 159 m (522 ft)

Population (2011)
  - Total: 14,302

Languages
  - Official: Hindi
- Time zone: UTC+5:30 (IST)
- Vehicle registration: UP64

Chopan is a town and a nagar panchayat in Sonbhadra district in the state of Uttar Pradesh, India. It is situated on the Sone River. Chopan Railway station is a junction in Sonbhadra district.

== Geography ==
Chopan is located at 24.52°N 83.03°E. It has an average elevation of 159 metres (521 feet).

== Demographics ==
As of 2011 India census, Chopan had total population of 14,302. The male population was 7,710, and the female population was 6,592. Chopan has an average literacy rate of 85.1%, higher than the national literacy rate with male literacy of 90% and female literacy of 79%. 14% of the population is under 6 years of age.
