= Anpara =

- Town
- Location in Uttar Pradesh, India
- Coordinates: 24.206°N 82.765°E
- Country: India
- State: Uttar Pradesh
- District: Sonbhadra
- Established: 1986

Government
  - Type: Democratic
  - Body: Nagar Panchayat

Population (2011)
  - Total: 17,978

Languages
  - Official: Hindi
- Time zone: UTC+5:30 (IST)
- PIN: 231225
- STD: 05446
- Vehicle registration: UP 64 XX XXXX

Anpara is a town in Sonbhadra district in the state of Uttar Pradesh, India. It hosts an Anpara Thermal Power Station with a total installed capacity 3830MW (2630MW of UPRVUNL and 1200 MW Of LANCO). It is built beside Govind Ballabh Pant Sagar Lake and the Rihand River (a tributary of the Son River).. The pin code of Anpara is 231225. It lies on the plateau of Vindhya Range.

There are two townships in Anpara i.e. UPRVUNL's ATP Colony(also referred as Board Colony) and the Megha Anpara Township(previously Lanco Colony). Without the area including rural part as well as commercial area namely Anpara Market, Parasi, Kashi more and Auri. Major schools are DAV Public School, St. Francis School, Ambedkar School, Aman Public School, Urmila Public School, GIC Anpara and KIDZEE. Apart from township, Anpara is maintained by the local governing body i.e. Gram Panchayat, Anpara. ATP colony consists of many types of government quarters such as first, second, third, fourth and fifth types. Government quarters are allotted as per grade of the services in power plant.

== Demographics ==
According to the 2001 Indian census Anpara had a population of 22 385, males constituting 55% of the population, an average literacy rate of 71%, and 14% of the population was under 6 years of age.

According to 2011 Indian census Anpara had a population of 17,978, Schedule Cast constituting 13.8% of population, an average literacy rate of 83.2% And Sex Ratio of 863.

== Climate ==
Anpara has been ranked 13th best “National Clean Air City” under (Category 3 population under 3 lakhs cities) in India.
