= Sonbhadra district =

District in Uttar Pradesh, India Purvanchal

Sonbhadra district Sonanchal
- District of Uttar Pradesh
- Sonebhadra
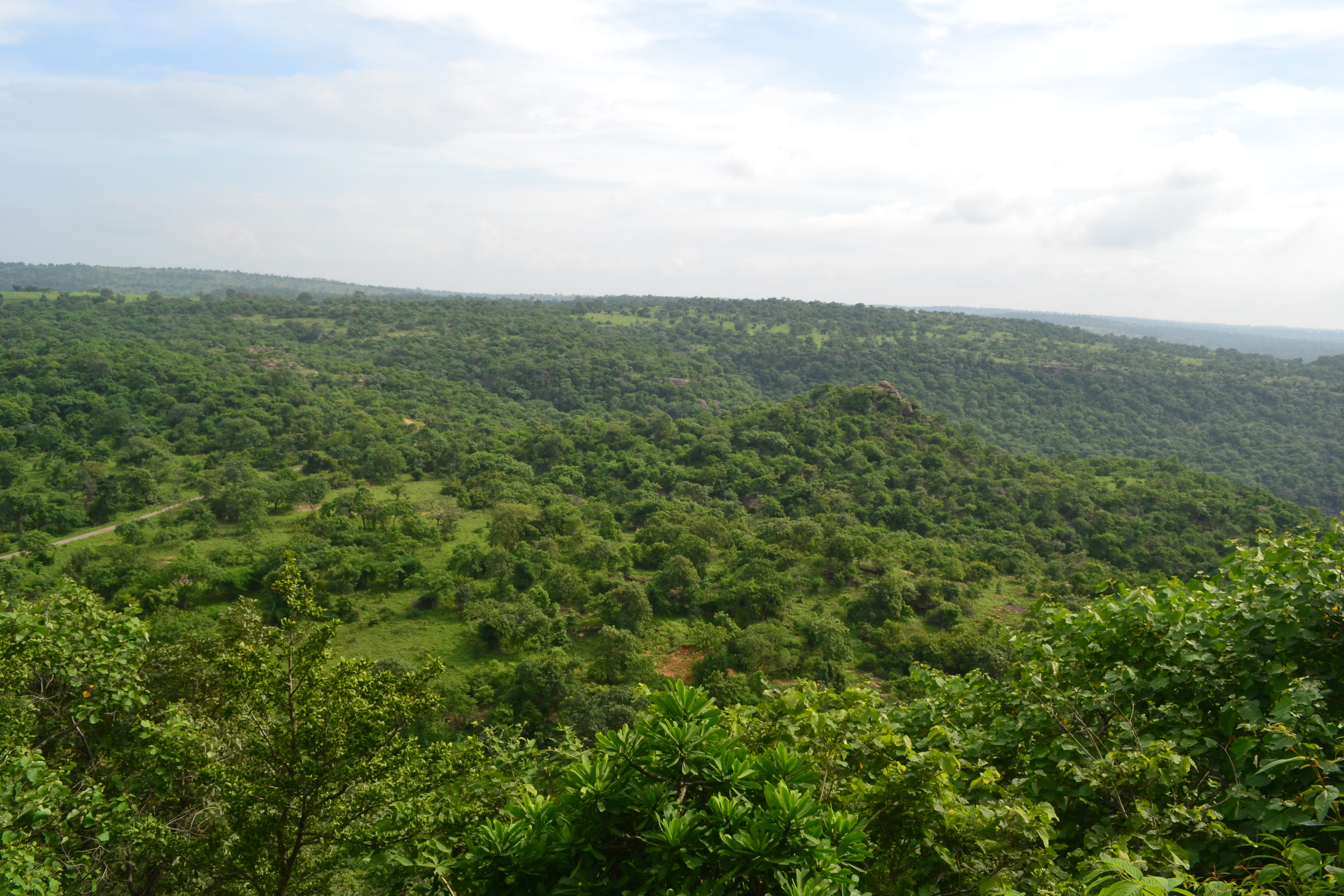
- View from Vijaygarh Fort

- Location of Sonbhadra district in Uttar Pradesh
- Country: India
- State: Uttar Pradesh
- Division: Mirzapur
- Established: 4 March 1989
- Named for: Son River
- Headquarters: Robertsganj
- Tehsils: Robertsganj; Ghorawal; Dudhi; Obra

Government
  - District Magistrate: Badrinath Singh, IAS
  - Superintendent of Police: Abhishek Verma , IPS

Area
  - Total: 6,788 km^{2} (2,621 sq mi)

Population (2011)
  - Total: 1,862,559
  - Density: 274.4/km^{2} (710.7/sq mi)

Language
  - Official: Hindi
  - Additional official: Urdu
  - Regional: Bhojpuri

Demographics
  - Literacy: 64%
  - Sex ratio: 918/1000
  - Scheduled Castes: 22.64% (421,661)
  - Scheduled Tribes: 20.67% (385,018)
- Time zone: UTC+05:30 (IST)
- Vehicle registration: UP-64
- Major highways: NH-39; SH-5A; SH-5
- Website: sonbhadra.nic.in

Sonbhadra district (also known as Sonebhadra) or Sonanchal is the second largest district by area of Uttar Pradesh after Lakhimpur Kheri. The district headquarters is in the town of Robertsganj. Sonbhadra is also known as the "Energy Capital of India" for hosting multiple power plants. Sonbhadra district is located in south eastern Uttar Pradesh.

Sonbhadra lies between Vindhya and Kaimur hills, and its topology and natural environment prompted the first Prime Minister of India Jawaharlal Nehru to refer to Sonbhadra as the "Switzerland of India".

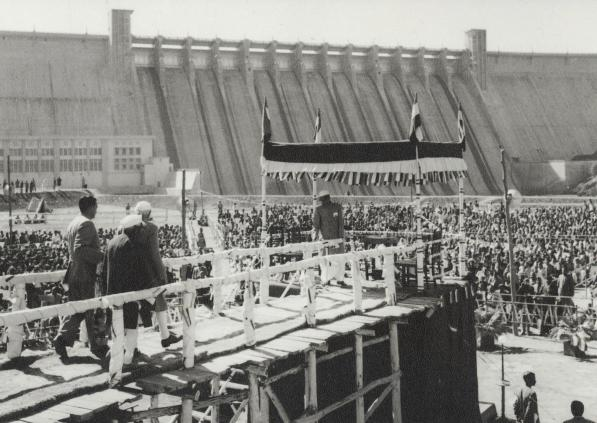
Jawaharlal Nehru at inauguration of Rihand Dam

In 2018 Uttar Pradesh's chief minister Yogi Adityanath recognised Sonbhadra as a tourist hub in Purvanchal region and further promoted by Uttar Pradesh Tourism Department.

In February 2020, a Press Trust of India (PTI) news report incorrectly claimed that the Geological Survey of India (GSI) had found 3,000 tonnes (3,300 tons) of gold deposits in Sonbhadra district. PTI later stated on Twitter that the GSI had told PTI that there had been no such discovery of large gold deposits in the district.

== History ==
The Valley of Son and Belan Rivers abounds in caves which were the earliest dwellings of the primeval inhabitants. This area had been the centre of activities of prehistoric humans, which is evident from the rock paintings (pre-historic cave art) found in abundance in this region. These paintings are of the periods ranging from Mesolithic to Paleolithic ages.

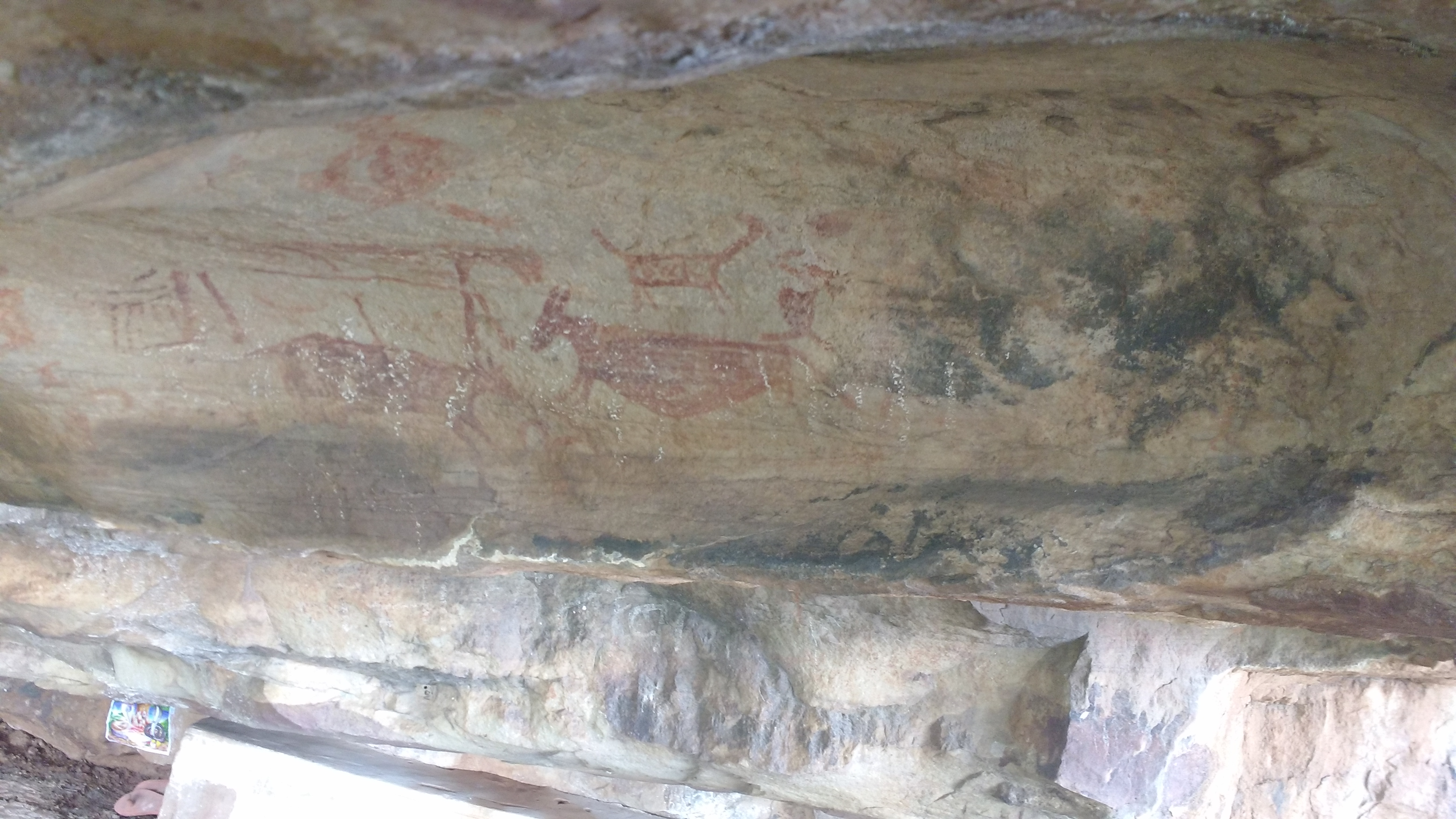
Cave Paintings at Panchmukhi Hill, Robertsganj in Sonbhadra

Sonbhadra, whose ancient name was Gramputra or Gupt Kashi, was built by the ancient king Putrak for his queen Paatali. It is said that 'Bhars' had settlements along with Chero, Searis and Kharwar communities in the district up to fifth century there was the rule of ''Chandel Rajput'' kings on Vijaygarh Fort. This district was famous as second Kashi during 11th to 13th centuries. In the 9th century B.C., the Brahmadutt dynasty was subdivided by Nagas. Kushan and Nagas also held supremacy over this region before the advent of the Gupta period. After the death of Harshvardhan in the latter half of the 7th century, it remained under the control of the Gurjara-Pratihars till 1025 before they were driven out by Mahmud of Ghazni. This area was under the administration of various Governors of Mughal emperors. Some of the forts such as Agori Fort were under the control of Madan Shah.

=== The forts located in the district ===
- Agori Fort
- Vijaygarh Fort
- Sodhrigarh Durg

The heroine of Famous Novel Chandrakanta written by Devaki Nandan Khatri was the princess of Vijaygarh and the daughter of king Jay Singh.

=== History of kingdoms in the region ===
Agori Barhar was an impartible estate. It originally comprised parts of the present districts of Sonbhadra and part of Mirzapur district. It was divided into two parganas of Agori and Barhar. Chandel Rajput Raja Paramardideva of Mahoba, ancestor of the family and contemporary of Raja Prithviraj III of Delhi, who attacked Mahoba as the Raja was the ally of Raja Jaichand of Kannauj, and occupied it for a time. Raja Paramardi Deva fled for his life with his friends and family, and though Mahoba was re-occupied by the Raja with the help of Jaichand of Kannauj, the glory of the capital never returned. During this time one of the sons of Raja Paramardi Deva, called Ashajit, fled eastwards in the turmoil that followed. His sons or grand sons called Barimal and Bharimal, captured Agori from the Kaharwar Raja and made themselves the independent rulers of Agori and Barhar. The elder brother Barimal took the kingdom of Agori and Barhar, and the younger brother Bharimal became the ruler of Bardi state ruled by Chandel -Rajput.

Another jagirdari in sonbhadra in Vijaygarh.it was also ruled by Chandel Dynasty after that by Narayan dynasty.

== Geography ==
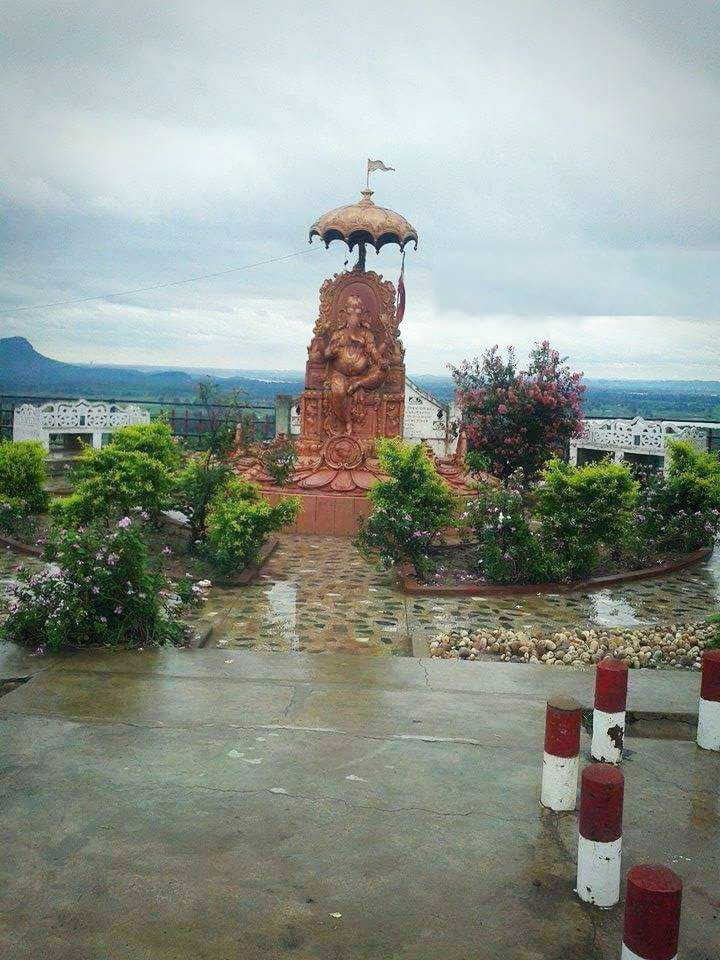
Son View Point

The district lies in the extreme south-east of the state and is bounded by Mirzapur district to the northwest, Chandauli district to the north, Kaimur and Rohtas districts of Bihar state to the north-east, Garhwa district of Jharkhand state to the east, Balrampur District of Chhattisgarh state to the south, and Singrauli district of Madhya Pradesh state to the west. The northern part of the district lies on a plateau of the Vindhya Range and is drained by tributaries of the Ganges, including the Belan and Karmanasha rivers. South of the steep escarpment of the Kaimur Range is the valley of the Son River, which flows through the district from west to east. The southern portion of the district is hilly, interspersed with fertile stream valleys. The Rihand River, which rises to the south in the highlands of Surguja district of Chhattisgarh, flows north to join the Son in the center of the district. The Govind Ballabh Pant Sagar, a reservoir on the Rihand, lies partly in the district and partly in Madhya Pradesh. East of the Rihand, the Kanhar River, which originates in Chhattisgarh, flows north to join the Son.

=== Climate ===
Sonbhadra has a relatively subtropical climate with high variation between summer and winter temperatures. The average temperature is 30 to 46 °C (86 to 115 °F) in the summer and 2 to 15 °C (36 to 59 °F) in the winter. The weather is pleasant in rainy season from July to October.

=== Ecology ===
The portion of the district north of the Son River lies in the Lower Gangetic plains moist deciduous forests ecoregion. The portion south of the Son lies in the Chhota Nagpur dry deciduous forests ecoregion.

Kaimoor Wildlife Sanctuary lies mostly within the district, reaching generally east and west along the spine of the Kaimur Range, and extending to the Son River at its eastern end.

== Demographics ==
Historical population
Year	Pop.	±% p.a.
1901	241,964	—
1911	239,431	−0.11%
1921	239,230	−0.01%
1931	260,445	+0.85%
1941	297,288	+1.33%
1951	336,065	+1.23%
1961	443,174	+2.81%
1971	580,593	+2.74%
1981	800,717	+3.27%
1991	1,104,210	+3.27%
2001	1,504,852	+3.14%
2011	1,862,559	+2.16%
Source: Census of India

Religions in Sonbhadra district (2011)
Religion	Percent
Hinduism	93.35%
Islam	5.56%
Other or not stated	1.09%

According to the 2011 census Sonbhadra district has a population of 1,862,559, of which male and female were 971,344 and 891,215 respectively. roughly equal to the nation of Kosovo or the US state of West Virginia. This gives it a ranking of 254th in India (out of a total of 640). The district has a population density of 270 inhabitants per square kilometre (700/sq mi). Its population growth rate over the decade 2001-2011 was 27.27%. 16.88% of the population lives in urban areas. Scheduled Castes and Scheduled Tribes make up 22.64% and 20.67% of the population respectively.

=== Sex ratio and child population ===
Sonbhadra has a sex ratio of 996 females for every 1000 males. In census enumeration, data regarding child undeg age six were also collected for districts Sonbhadra. There were total 323,092 children under age six against 302,834 of 2001 census. Of total 323,092 male and female were 167,870 and 155,222 respectively. Child sex ratio as per census 2011 was 925 compared to 956 of census 2001. In 2011, children under age six formed 17.35 percent of Sonbhadra District compared to 20.69 percent of 2001. There was net change of -3.34 percent in this compared to previous census.

=== Literacy rate ===
literacy rate of 64%. Male and female literacy were 74.92% and 52.14% respectively. Total literate in Sonbhadra District were 985,708 of which male and female were 601,988 and 383,720 respectively.

=== Language ===
Languages in Sonbhadra district (2011)
1. Hindi (83.9%)
2. Bhojpuri (14.6%)
3. Others (1.52%)

At the time of the 2011 Census of India, 83.91% of the population in the district spoke Hindi and 14.57% spoke Bhojpuri as their first language. Around 5,000 people in the district speak Gondi and 1,800 Kurukh, both tribal languages. Bhojpuri is the native language in the district.

=== Sonbhadra district urban population ===
Out of the total Sonbhadra population for 2011 census, 16.88 percent lives in urban regions of district. In total 314,342 people lives in urban areas of which males are 167,999 and females are 146,343. Sex Ratio in urban region of Sonbhadra district is 871 as per 2011 census data. Similarly child sex ratio in Sonbhadra district was 868 in 2011 census. Child population (0-6) in urban region was 38,169 of which males and females were 20,434 and 17,735. This child population figure of Sonbhadra district is 12.16% of total urban population.there are 11.7% urban people belong to scheduled casts and 3.2% urban people belong to scheduled tribes.

Average literacy rate in Sonbhadra Urban as per census 2011 is 84.31% of which males and females are 90.73% and 76.93% literates respectively.

== Economy ==
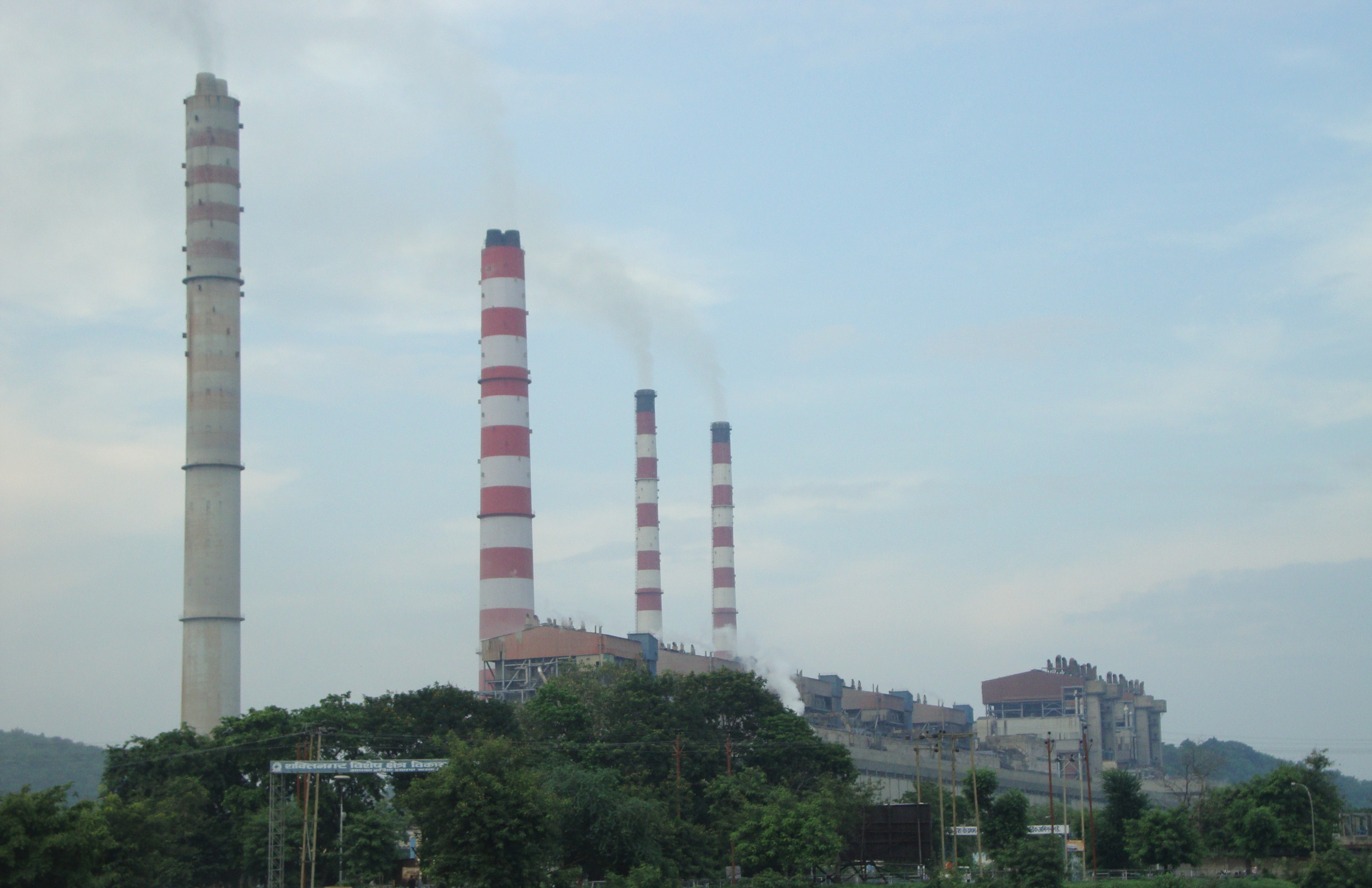
Singrauli Super Thermal Power Station at Shaktinagar in Sonbhadra

The district has many electrical power stations around Govind Ballabh Pant Sagar. NTPC has two coal-based thermal power plants, being Singrauli Super Thermal Power Station at Shaktinagar and Rihand Thermal Power Station at Rihand Nagar. Other power stations are at Anpara (UPRVUNL), Obra (UPRVUNL), Renusagar (Hindalco) and Pipri-Hydro (UPRVUNL). Northern Coalfields (a branch of Coal India Limited) has its headquarters and many coal mines in this region.

Hindalco has a major aluminium plant at Renukut. Owing to the limestone hills, initially one cement factory was established at Churk in 1956. Another cement factory started at Dala in 1971, with an ancillary unit at Chunar from 1980. A big dam constructed at Pipri in 1961 is named Rihand Dam; a small dam was constructed at Obra in 1968.

The Birla group set up an aluminum plant at Renukut. The company set up its own power plant at Renusagar in 1967 and started a company in Renukut called HiTech Carbon. Another industrial group initiated a company in Renukut named Grasim Industries Limited, which produces chemicals, and later it started its own power plant at Renukut in 1998.

In 2006 the Ministry of Panchayati Raj named Sonbhadra as one of the country's 250 most backward districts (out of a total of 640). It is one of the 34 districts in Uttar Pradesh currently receiving funds from the Backward Regions Grant Fund Programme (BRGF).

== Tourist attraction ==
Salkhan Fossils Park in Sonbhadra district

=== Historical places ===
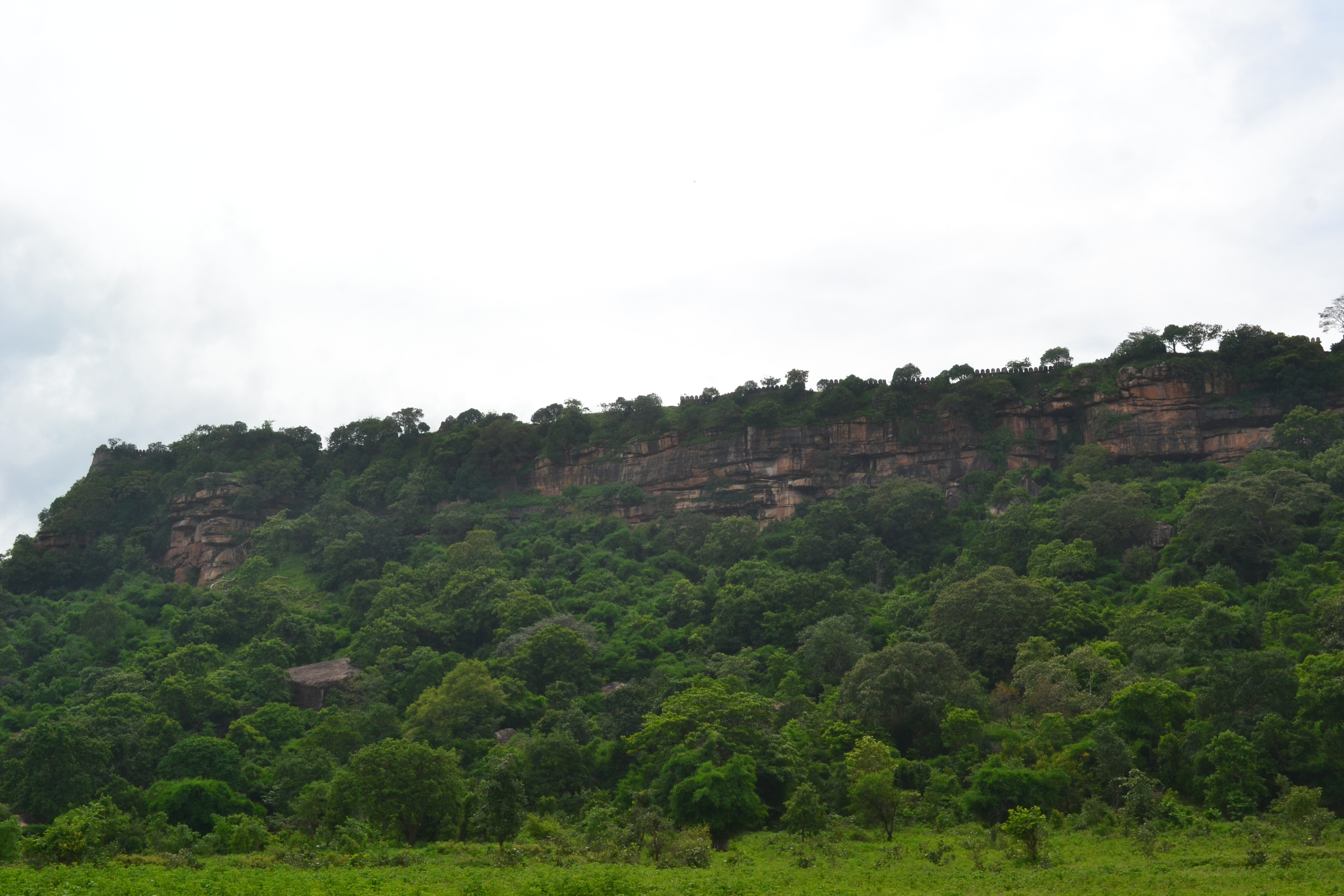
Vijaygarh Fort on the Hill top

- Vijaygarh Fort
- Agori Fort
- Veer Lorik Patthar
- Cave Paintings of Son and Belan Valley, Sonbhadra

=== Nature ===
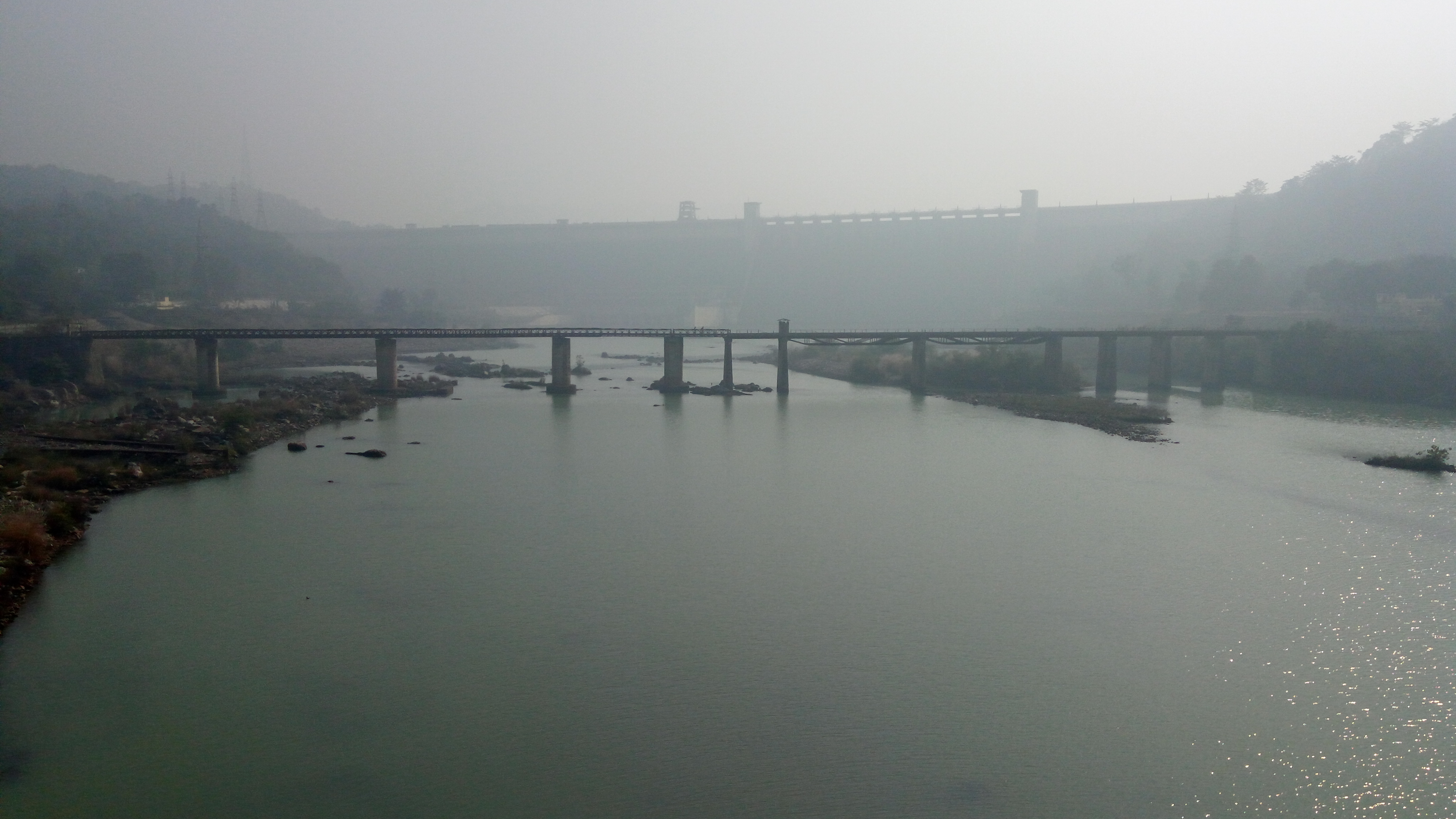
Rihand Dam

- Salkhan Fossil Park
- Mukkha Fall
- Son View Point, Robertsganj
- Rihand Dam
- Dhanraul Dam
- Kaimoor Wildlife Sanctuary

=== Temples ===
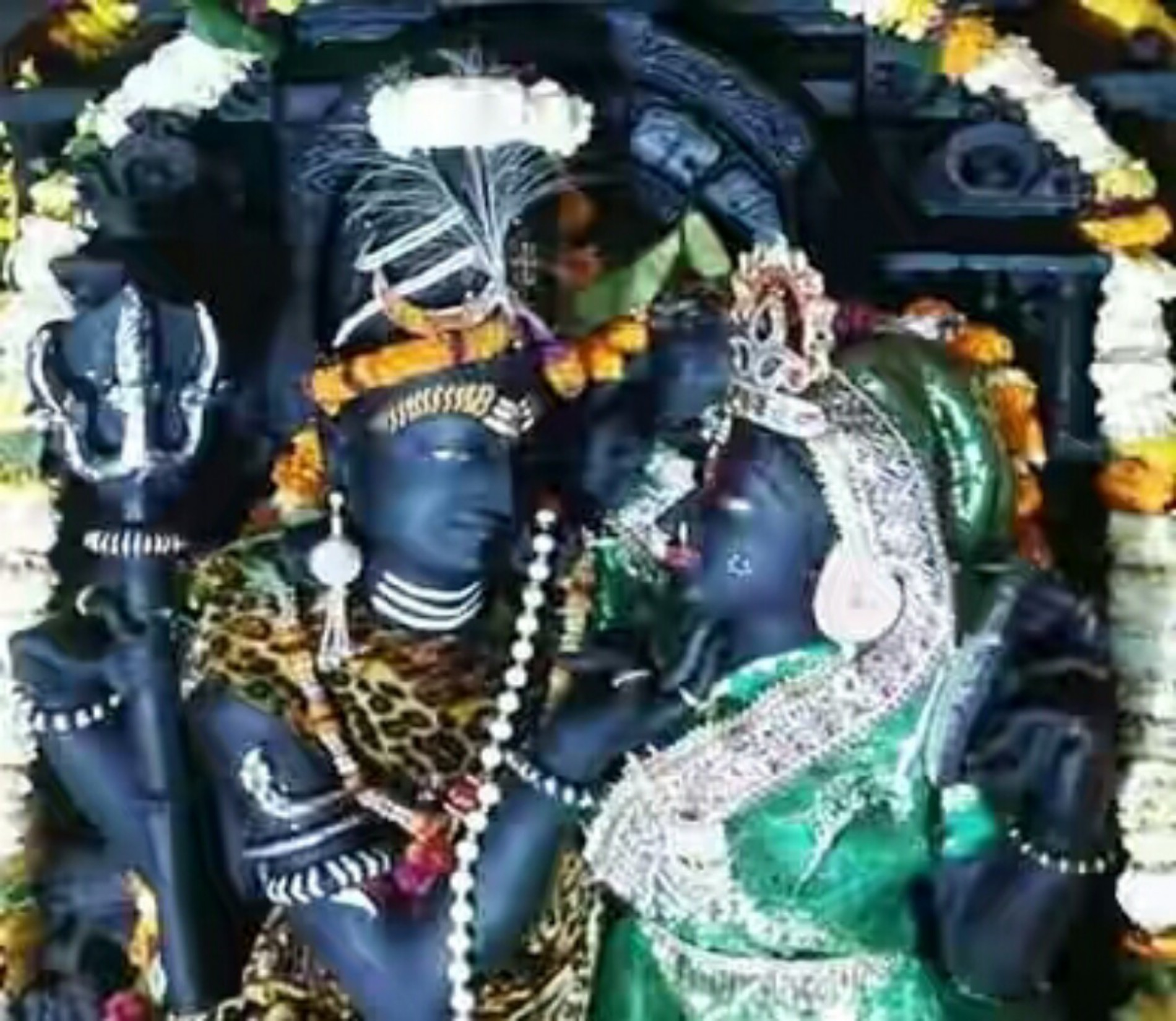
Shivdwar Temple

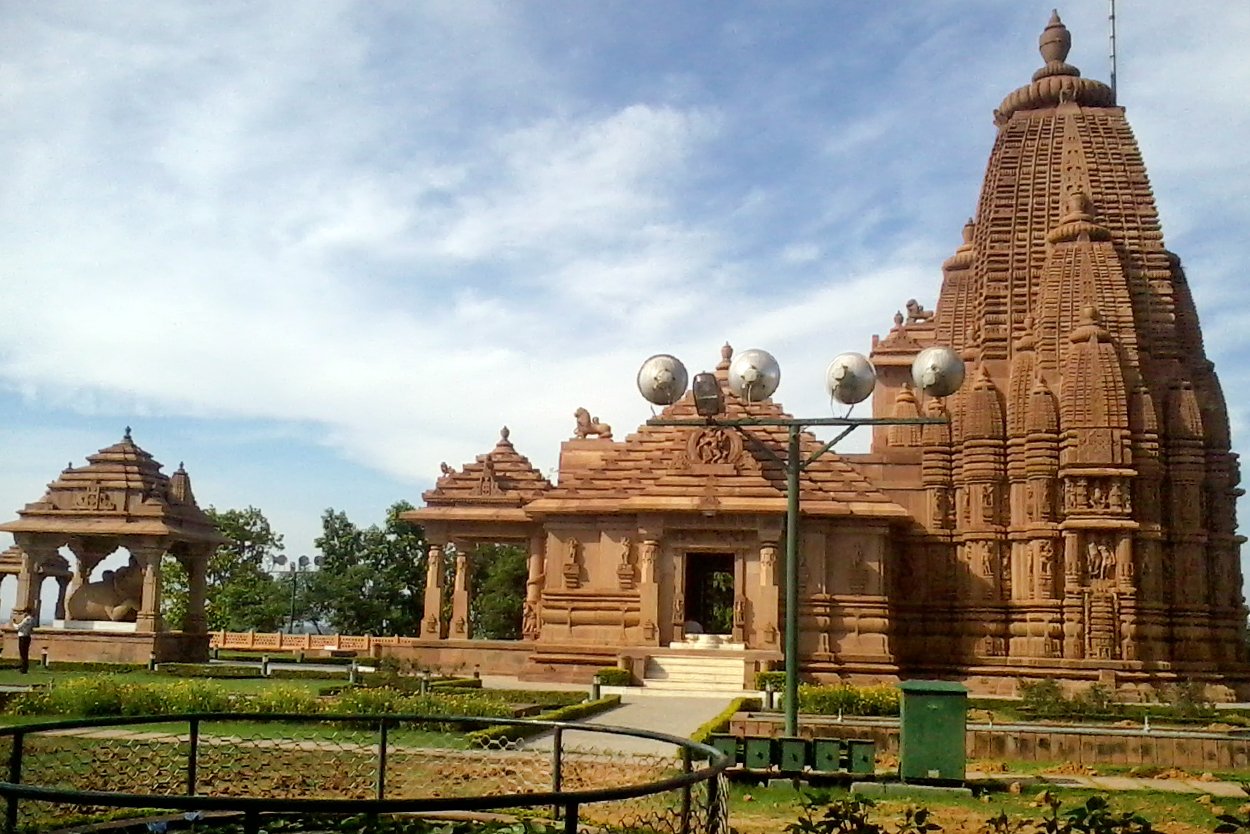
Renukeshwar Mahadev Temple

- Shivdwar
- Renukeshwar Mahadev Temple
- Vandevi Temple
- Jwaladevi Temple, Shaktinagar
- Maa Vaishnav Shaktipeeth Dalla
- Ambedkar Park

== Transport ==
=== By air ===
- Muirpur Airport at Muirpur, an operational airstrip and proposed airport, currently used by chartered and private planes near Renukut
- Varanasi International Airport in Varanasi. Flights are available to all major Indian cities including Delhi, Mumbai, Kolkata, Lucknow, Agra, Bangalore, Chennai, Patna, Khajuraho, Hyderabad, Gaya, etc. International connections are Bangkok, Colombo, Hong Kong and Kathmandu from Varanasi International Airport.

=== By train ===
- Mirzapur Railway Station
- Sonbhadra Railway Station
- Chopan Railway station
- Renukoot Railway station near Rihand Dam
- Anpara Railway station
- Singrauli Railway station (in Madhya Pradesh)
- Shaktinagar Railway station
- Varanasi Railway station
- Dudhi Railway station

The city is connected by rail to Delhi, Allahabad, Ranchi and Patna. Some notable trains passing through the district are Muri express (Jammu Tawi - Delhi - Tata Nagar), Jharkhand Swarna Jayanti Express/12873(Hatia - Kanpur - Delhi), Triveni Express (Bareilly - Lucknow - Shaktinagar/Singrauli/barwadih) Bhopal Express (Bhopal-Howrah) weekly and Shaktipunj Express/11448(Howrah-Bokaro - Chopan- Jabalpur). Intercity Express/03346 (Singrauli- Chopan-Varanasi).

=== By road ===
Robertsganj, the headquarters of Sonbhadra, is located about 88 km (55 mi) from the city of Varanasi which has the nearest airport. Robertsganj is well connected to Lucknow, Allahabad, Varanasi, Mirzapur, Gorakhpur, Faizabad, Ambikapur Sasaram & Garhwa by road. Buses are available at all hours of the day from Varanasi, and it normally takes 2 1/2 hours to cover the distance. The highway connecting Varanasi and Waidhan passes through the district. Though this is not a national highway it is a very busy road because of the towns Dalla, Renukot, Anpara, Shaktinagar which are sufficiently commercialized areas. National Thermal Power Corporation is in Shaktinagar, and also Northern Coalfields Limited (a subsidiary company of Coal India Ltd) has different projects like Singrauli, Khadia, Jayant, Dudhichua, Amlori, Kakri, etc. These areas have several major coal mines, which cater to a big part of the coal need of the state. Churk a nearby town, is situated around 10 km (6.2 mi), where Jaypee Group is establishing a thermal power project. One of the main reasons this road is always busy is due to daily transport of around 1000 trucks of grits and sand.

== Notable people ==
Politicians

- Ram Shakal
- Lalchandra
- Bhai Lal
- Chhotelal
- Pakaudi Lal Kol

Civil Servants

- Prithul Kumar

Artists

- Vivek Mushran Bollywood actor
- Anurag Kashyap Film director
- Abhinav Kashyap Film director
- Saumya Mishra Indian Idol season 9 contestant (Singer)
- Vartika Jha Dancer, Choreographer and Actress, second runner up of Dance Plus (season 4)
- Mohammed Hanif Khan Shastri Indian Sanskrit Scholar, The Government of India awarded civilian award Padma Shri (Literature & Education) in 2019
