= Mirzapur Lok Sabha constituency =

Lok Sabha constituency in Uttar Pradesh

Coordinates: 25.14°N 82.57°E

Mirzapur UP-79
- Lok Sabha constituency
- Interactive Map Outlining Mirzapur Lok Sabha constituency

Constituency details
- Country: India
- Region: North India
- State: Uttar Pradesh
- Assembly constituencies: Chhanbey; Mirzapur; Majhawan; Chunar; Marihan
- Established: 1952–present
- Reservation: None

Member of Parliament
- 18th Lok Sabha
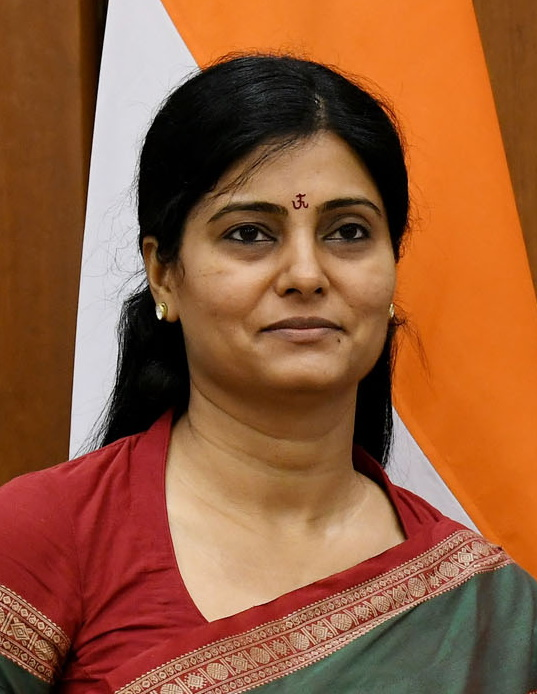
- Incumbent Anupriya Singh Patel
- Party: AD(S)
- Alliance: NDA
- Elected year: 2024
- Preceded by: Bal Kumar Patel

Mirzapur is one of the 80 Lok Sabha (parliamentary) constituencies in Uttar Pradesh, a state in northern India. This constituency covers the entirety of the Mirzapur district.

== Assembly segments ==
The Mirzapur Lok Sabha constituency comprises five Vidhan Sabha (legislative assembly) segments. These are:

No	Name	District	Member	Party	2024 Lead
395	Chhanbey (SC)	Mirzapur	Rinki Kol	AD(S)	AD(S)
396	Mirzapur	Mirzapur	Ratnakar Mishra	BJP	AD(S)
397	Majhawan	Mirzapur	Suchismita Maurya	BJP	AD(S)
398	Chunar	Mirzapur	Anurag Singh	BJP	AD(S)
399	Marihan	Mirzapur	Rama Shankar Patel	BJP	SP

== Members of Parliament ==
Year	Member	Party
1952	John N. Wilson	Indian National Congress
1957	John N. Wilson	Indian National Congress
1962	Shyam Dhar Mishra	Indian National Congress
1967	Bansh Narain Singh	Bharatiya Jana Sangh
1971	Aziz Imam	Indian National Congress
1977	Faquir Ali Ansari	Janata Party
1980	Aziz Imam	Indian National Congress (I)
1981^	Umakant Mishra	Indian National Congress (I)
1984	Umakant Mishra	Indian National Congress
1989	Yusuf Beg	Janata Dal
1991	Virendra Singh	Bharatiya Janata Party
1996	Phoolan Devi	Samajwadi Party
1998	Virendra Singh	Bharatiya Janata Party
1999	Phoolan Devi	Samajwadi Party
2002^	Ram Rati Bind	Samajwadi Party
2004	Narendra Kushwaha	Bahujan Samaj Party
2007^	Ramesh Dube	Bahujan Samaj Party
2009	Bal Kumar Patel	Samajwadi Party
2014	Anupriya Patel	Apna Dal (Kamerawadi)
2019	Anupriya Patel	Apna Dal (Soneylal)
2024	Anupriya Patel	Apna Dal (Soneylal)

^By-Poll

== Election results ==
Vote share of winning candidates
2024	42.67%
2019	53.34%
2014	43.32%

=== 2024 ===
2024 Indian general elections: Mirzapur
Party	Candidate	Votes	%	±%
AD(S)	Anupriya Patel	471,631	42.67	▼10.67
SP	Ramesh Chand Bind	4,33,821	39.25	▲6.83
BSP	Manish Kumar	1,44,446	13.07	▲13.07
NOTA	None of the Above	15,049	1.36	▼0.02
Majority		37,810	3.42	▼17.50
Turnout		11,05,405	57.99	▼2.12
AD(S) hold		Swing		

=== 2019 ===
2019 Indian general elections: Mirzapur
Party	Candidate	Votes	%	±%
AD(S)	Anupriya Singh Patel	591,564	53.34	▲10.02
SP	Ram Charitra Nishad	3,59,556	32.42	▲21.62
INC	Lalitesh Pati Tripathi	91,501	8.25	▼6.9
NOTA	None of the Above	15,353	1.38	▲0.93
Bhartiya Republican Party (Insan)	Radheshyam Inshan	14,142	1.28	N/A
Satya Bahumat Party	Archana Mishra	9,206	0.83	N/A
CPI(ML)L	Jeera Bharti	8,553	0.77	N/A
RSPS	Dinesh Kumar Pal	7,145	0.64	N/A
PSP(L)	Ashish Kumar Tripathi	4,024	0.36	New
Majority		2,32,008	20.92	▼0.82
Turnout		11,09,059	60.11	▲1.55
AD(S) gain from AD(K)		Swing		

=== 2014 ===
2014 Indian general elections: Mirzapur
Party	Candidate	Votes	%	±%
AD(K)	Anupriya Singh Patel	436,536	43.32	▲40.72
BSP	Samudra Bind	2,17,457	21.58	▼5.60
INC	Lalitesh Pati Tripathi	1,52,666	15.15	▲7.48
SP	Surendra Singh Patel	1,08,859	10.80	▼19.07
IND.	Ashok Kumar	11,245	1.12	▲1.12
NOTA	None of the Above	4,539	0.45	▲0.45
Majority		2,19,079	21.74	▲19.05
Turnout		10,07,646	58.56	▲6.43
AD(K) gain from SP		Swing	▲13.45	

== See also ==
- Mirzapur district
- List of constituencies of the Lok Sabha
