= Narendra Kumar Kushwaha =

Indian politician

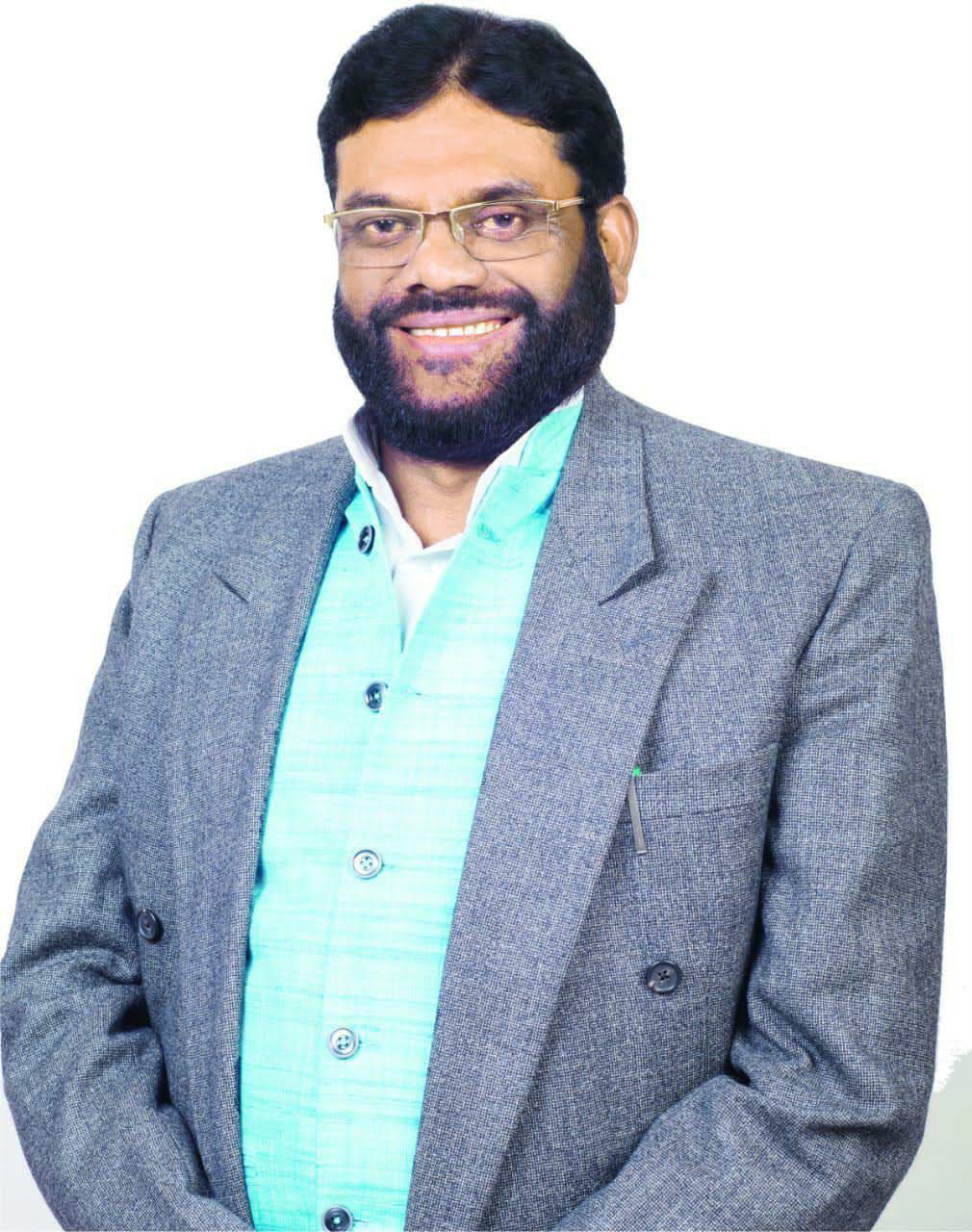

Member of Parliament, Lok Sabha
- In office 2004–2007
- Preceded by: Ram Rati Bind
- Succeeded by: Ramesh Dube
- Constituency: Mirzapur

Personal details
- Born: 1 July 1967 (age 58) Chopan, Uttar Pradesh
- Party: BSP
- Spouse: Malati Devi
- Children: Azad Kushwaha;Angad Singh Kushwaha;Anupriya singh kushwaha
- As of 22 September, 2006 Source: ["Official biography". Parliament of India records. Archived from the original on 15 June 2006.]

Narendra Kumar Kushwaha (born 1 July 1967) is an Indian politician with the Bahujan Samaj Party (BSP). He stood for the 2004 Lok Sabha elections on the BSP ticket and was a Member of Parliament from Mirzapur.
