= Tiwaripur =

Tiwaripur is the name of several villages in India:

- Tiwaripur, Jaunpur, Kerakat tehsil, Jaunpur district, Uttar Pradesh
- Tiwaripur, Mirzapur, Mirzapur district, Uttar Pradesh
