= Uttar Pradesh Tourism =

Indian state tourism agency

- Map of Uttar Pradesh
- Formation: 1974; 52 years ago
- Founder: Ministry of Tourism
- Founded at: Lucknow
- Type: Governmental organization
- Purpose: Tourism in Uttar Pradesh
- Headquarters: Lucknow
- Location: Gomti Nagar, Lucknow
- Region served: Uttar Pradesh
- Tourism Minister (Independent Charge): Jaiveer Singh
- Principal Secretary: Mukesh Kumar Meshram, IAS
- Director: Prakhar Misra, IFS
- Website: uptourism.gov.in

Uttar Pradesh Tourism (commonly referred to as Uttar Pradesh Tourism Department or UP Tourism Department) is a state government agency which is responsible for promotion of tourism in the Indian state of Uttar Pradesh. The department is also responsible for drafting and implementation of the tourism policy, including heritage, air service, and eco-tourism policies for Uttar Pradesh.

== History ==
To promote tourism, the Directorate of Tourism was established in the 1972 with a Director/Director General who is an IAS officer. In 1974 the Uttar Pradesh State Tourism Development Corporation was established to look after the commercial tourist activities. The organisation is now simply known as "Uttar Pradesh Tourism".

To boost the tourism in the state from within the country and other parts of the world, the Government of Uttar Pradesh established an Uttar Pradesh Heritage Arc covering the cities of Ayodhya, Mathura, Vrindavan, Agra, Mirzapur, Lucknow and Varanasi and organised "Uttar Pradesh Travel Mart" in 2015 in Lucknow. The event was attended by 80 delegates from 27 countries.

== Organisation ==
Uttar Pradesh Tourism is headed by Director-general or Director and is under the purview of the Department of Tourism, Uttar Pradesh. Reporting to the DG or Director, are the Regional Offices which is represented by the Regional Tourist Officers (R.T.O). Uttar Pradesh Tourism has offices all over India and has overseas representation in Australia, Canada, France, Germany, Italy, Japan, Netherlands, Singapore, South Africa, United Arab Emirates, United Kingdom and in the United States.

Senior officials at Secretariat
Name	Designation
Mukesh Kumar Meshram, IAS	Principal Secretary
Ravi Ranjan, IAS	Special Secretary
Isha Priya, IAS	Special Secretary

Senior officials at Directorate
Name	Designation
Mukesh Kumar Meshram	Director General
Prakhar Mishra	Director
	Joint Director
	Deputy Director
	Senior Research Officer

== 2015 Tourism policy ==
The Uttar Pradesh Government has drafted a new tourism policy in 2015 with following key objectives.

1. To identify and develop new tourism products.
2. Development of new tourism circuits and development of old circuits.
3. Expansion and improvement of existing tourism infrastructure.
4. Creation of infrastructure on tourist places.
5. Development of alternative tourism.
6. Improvement of quality of tourism products in the state.
7. To improve and preserve the art and culture of the state.
8. To create awareness and sensitivity about tourism in general public.
9. Public–private partnership in the field of tourism.
10. To make UP tourism a memorable experience for the tourists.
11. To make inter-state travel easier by modernising transportation.

== See also ==
- Tourism in Uttar Pradesh
- Ministry of Tourism (India)
