= Piparwar =

Village in Uttar Pradesh, India

Piparwar is a village in Mirzapur, Uttar Pradesh, India.
