= Nadara =

Village in Uttar Pradesh, India

Coordinates: 25°26′N 83°28′E

Nadara is a village in Mirzapur, Uttar Pradesh, India.
