= Beekana Etwa =

Village in Uttar Pradesh, India

Beekana Etwa is a village in Mirzapur, Uttar Pradesh, India.
