= Mewali =

Village in Uttar Pradesh, India

Mewali is a village in Mirzapur, Uttar Pradesh, India.
