= Kathipachawa =

Village in Uttar Pradesh, India

Kathipachawa is a village in Mirzapur district, Uttar Pradesh, India.
