= Kachhawadeeh =

Village in Uttar Pradesh, India

Kachhawadeeh is a village in Mirzapur, Uttar Pradesh, India.
