= Khamharia =

Village in Uttar Pradesh, India

Coordinates: 20°59′N 82°16′E

Khamharia is a village in Mirzapur, Uttar Pradesh, India.
