= Bijuri Kota =

Village in Uttar Pradesh, India

Bijuri Kota is a village in Mirzapur, Uttar Pradesh, India.
