= Jingura =

Village in Uttar Pradesh, India

Jingura is a village in Mirzapur, Uttar Pradesh, India.
