= Karsara =

Village in Uttar Pradesh, India

Karsara is a village in Mirzapur, Uttar Pradesh, India.
