= Vakiyabad =

Village in Uttar Pradesh, India

Vakiyabad is a village in Mirzapur, Uttar Pradesh, India.
