= Manik Alha =

Village in Uttar Pradesh, India

Manik Alha is a village in Mirzapur, Uttar Pradesh, India.
