= Magaraha =

Village in Uttar Pradesh, India

Mangaraha is a village in Mirzapur, Uttar Pradesh, India.
