= Aziz Imam =

Indian politician (1925–1980)

Member of Parliament, Lok Sabha
- In office 1980–1980
- Constituency: Mirzapur

Member of Parliament, Lok Sabha
- In office 1971–1977
- Constituency: Mirzapur

Member of Uttar Pradesh Legislative Assembly
- In office 1952–1966
- Constituency: Mirzapur

Personal details
- Born: 25 February 1925 United Provinces of British India
- Died: 1980 (aged 55)
- Party: Indian National Congress
- Spouse: Ashraf-un-Nisa
- Children: 5
- Parent: Yusuf Imam (father)
- Occupation: Politician, Agriculturist
- Source

Aziz Imam (25 February 1925 – 1980) was an Indian politician, agriculturist, and parliamentary secretary. He served as a member of the Uttar Pradesh Assembly. He then represented the Mirzapur constituency after elected to the fifth and the seventh general elections, collectively from 1971 to 1980. Affiliated with the Indian National Congress, he served member of the All India Congress Committee and Uttar Pradesh Congress Committee.

== Biography ==
Aziz Imam was born to Yusuf Imam in United Provinces of British India (in present-day Mirzapur, Uttar Pradesh) on 25 February 1925. He was married to Ashraf-un-Nisa on 20 February 1949, with which he had five children. He did his Master of Arts and Bachelor of Laws from the Aligarh Muslim University.

Imam served at multiple posts at during his political career. He was appointed to the government of Uttar Pradesh as a minister of education in 1962. He also served as general secretary of U.P.C.C. and A.l.C.C. and later, he was appointed as a Chairman for Minority Board A.I.C.C and vice-president of the U.P.C.C. Later, he served president of Chapra Mazdoor Sabha, E.Hill Carpet Mazdoor Sabha, and Kasar-batti Mazdoor Sabha. He also served vice-president of D.C.D.F. and the member of Uttar Pradesh Vidhan Sabha from 1952 to 1966, and 5th from 1971 to 1977 and 6th Lok Sabha from 1980 until his death later that year.

Imam died in office in 1980, at the age of 55.
