= Jalalpur, Mirzapur =

Village in Uttar Pradesh, India

Jalalpur is a village in Mirzapur, Uttar Pradesh, India.
