= Ghamahapur =

Village in Uttar Pradesh, India

Ghamahapur is a village in Mirzapur, Uttar Pradesh, India.
