= Rajnath Singh =

Defense Minister of India since 2019

- Rajnath Singh, c. 2026

29th Union Minister of Defence
- Incumbent
- Assumed office 30 May 2019
- President: Ramnath Kovind; Droupadi Murmu
- Prime Minister: Narendra Modi
- Preceded by: Nirmala Sitharaman

30th Union Minister of Home Affairs
- In office 26 May 2014 – 30 May 2019
- President: Pranab Mukherjee; Ram Nath Kovind
- Prime Minister: Narendra Modi
- Preceded by: Sushilkumar Shinde
- Succeeded by: Amit Shah

Member of Parliament, Lok Sabha
- Incumbent
- Assumed office 16 May 2014
- Preceded by: Lalji Tandon
- Constituency: Lucknow, Uttar Pradesh
- In office 16 May 2009 – 16 May 2014
- Preceded by: Constituency established
- Succeeded by: V. K. Singh
- Constituency: Ghaziabad, Uttar Pradesh

8th National President of the Bharatiya Janata Party
- In office 24 January 2013 – 8 July 2014
- Preceded by: Nitin Jairam Gadkari
- Succeeded by: Amit Shah
- In office 31 December 2005 – 19 December 2009
- Preceded by: L. K. Advani
- Succeeded by: Nitin Jairam Gadkari

27th Union Minister of Agriculture
- In office 24 May 2003 – 22 May 2004
- Prime Minister: Atal Bihari Vajpayee
- Preceded by: Ajit Singh
- Succeeded by: Sharad Pawar

19th Chief Minister of Uttar Pradesh
- In office 28 October 2000 – 8 March 2002
- Governor: Vishnu Kant Shastri
- Preceded by: Ram Prakash Gupta
- Succeeded by: President's rule

34th Union Minister of Surface Transport
- In office 22 November 1999 – 27 October 2000
- Prime Minister: Atal Bihari Vajpayee
- Preceded by: Nitish Kumar
- Succeeded by: B. C. Khanduri

Member of Parliament, Rajya Sabha
- In office 26 November 2002 – 25 November 2008
- Preceded by: Balwant Singh Ramoowalia
- Succeeded by: Kusum Rai
- Constituency: Uttar Pradesh
- In office 3 April 1994 – 19 April 2001
- Preceded by: Z. A. Ahmed
- Succeeded by: Kalraj Mishra
- Constituency: Uttar Pradesh

4th National President of the Bharatiya Janata Yuva Morcha
- In office 1988–1990
- Preceded by: Pramod Mahajan
- Succeeded by: J. P. Nadda

Personal details
- Born: 10 July 1951 (age 75) Bhabhaura, Uttar Pradesh, India
- Party: Bharatiya Janata Party
- Other political affiliations: Janata Party (1977–1980); Bharatiya Jana Sangh (before 1977)
- Spouse: Savitri Singh (m. 1971)
- Children: 3 (including Pankaj Singh)
- Education: Gorakhpur University (M.Sc., Physics)
- Profession: Politician; lecturer
- Website: rajnathsingh.in

Rajnath Singh (Hindi pronunciation: [ɾɑːd͡ʒnɑːt̪ʰ sɪŋɡʱ]; born 10 July 1951) is an Indian politician and lecturer who is serving as the 29th Minister of Defence since 2019 and as the Deputy Leader of the House, Lok Sabha since 2014. He is a Member of Parliament from Lucknow since 2014. He previously served as the 25th Union Minister of Home Affairs in the first Modi ministry from 2014 to 2019, making him the first person born after Indian independence to hold the office. A veteran leader of the Bharatiya Janata Party (BJP), he also served as its President from 2005 to 2009 and again from 2013 to 2014. Singh started his career as a swayamsevak of the Rashtriya Swayamsevak Sangh.

Singh previously served as the chief minister of Uttar Pradesh from 2000 to 2002 and a Cabinet Minister for Road Transport and Highways in the Vajpayee Government from 1999 to 2000 and the minister of Agriculture from 2003 to 2004. He was the President of Bharatiya Janata Yuva Morcha from 1988 to 1990. He was a member of the Uttar Pradesh Legislative Assembly from Haidergarh constituency twice. He previously represented Ghaziabad in the Lok Sabha from 2009 to 2014. He was also a member of Rajya Sabha from 2002 to 2008 and from 1994 to 2001.

== Early life ==
Rajnath Singh was born in Bhabhaura village of Chandauli district, Uttar Pradesh to father Ram Badan Singh and mother Gujarati Devi. He was born into a family of farmers. He received his primary education from a local school of his village and went on to secure a master's degree in physics, acquiring first division results from Gorakhpur University. From childhood he was inspired by the ideology of Rashtriya Swayamsevak Sangh. He worked as a lecturer of physics at K.B. Post-Graduate College Mirzapur, Uttar Pradesh.

== Early political career ==
=== Entry into politics ===
Singh had been associated with the Rashtriya Swayamsevak Sangh since 1964, at the age of 13 and remained connected with the organisation. He also became Shakha Karyavah (General Secretary) of Mirzapur in the year 1972. After 2 years in the year 1974, he entered politics. Between 1969 and 1971 he was the organizational secretary of the Akhil Bharatiya Vidyarthi Parishad (the student wing of the RSS) in Gorakhpur. He became the general secretary of the RSS's Mirzapur branch in 1972. In 1974, he was appointed secretary for the Mirzapur unit of the Bharatiya Jana Sangh, predecessor of Bharatiya Janata Party. In 1975, aged 24, Singh was appointed District President of the Jana Sangh.

=== JP Movement and Emergency ===
In the 1970s, Singh was influenced by the JP Movement of Jayaprakash Narayan. He was also arrested in the year 1975 during the state of National Emergency for associating with JP Movement and was detained for a time period of 2 years.

=== Entry into electoral politics ===
After being released from jail, Singh joined the Janata Party founded by Jayprakash Narayan and contested legislative assembly elections from Mirzapur in 1977. He successfully fought the election and was elected as a Member of Legislative Assembly from Mirzapur.

=== Rise within BJP ===
At that time he gained the popularity in state politics and then joined BJP in the year 1980 and was one of the initial members of the Party. He became the State President of the BJP youth wing in 1984, the National general secretary in 1986 and the National President in 1988. He was also elected into the Uttar Pradesh Legislative Council.

== Early ministerial roles ==
=== Education Minister (1991–1992) ===
In 1991, when the Bharatiya Janata Party formed its first government in Uttar Pradesh under chief minister Kalyan Singh, he was appointed education minister of Uttar Pradesh. He held the education portfolio for a tenure of two years. Major highlights of his tenure as education minister included the controversial Anti-Copying Act, 1992, which made copying a non-bailable offence, modernising science texts, and incorporating vedic mathematics into the curriculum.

==== Anti-Copying Act, 1992 ====
Singh helped push the controversial Anti-Copying Act in response to perceived widespread cheating in schools and colleges in Uttar Pradesh. when Mulayam Singh Yadav became the chief minister of Uttar Pradesh, heading Bahujan Samaj Party in the year 1993 he repealed the Act.

==== Modernising the education system ====
In 1991, Singh led a partial rewrite of history textbooks used in government schools and introduced vedic mathematics into the curriculum. Seen as loyal to the RSS, a Hindu nationalist organisation, Singh's changes to state education policy were widely perceived to have been motivated by his RSS affiliation and ideological kinship with the organisation's leadership. As minister, he also focused on promoting the usage of Indian languages instead of English in courses and instruction. At the same time, he stated his appreciation for knowledge of modern languages.

=== Union Transport Minister (1999–2000) ===
In April 1994, he was elected into the Rajya Sabha (Upper House of the Parliament) and became involved with the Advisory Committee on Industry (1994–96), Consultative Committee for the Ministry of Agriculture, Business Advisory Committee, House Committee and the Committee on Human Resource Development. On 25 March 1997, he became the President of the BJP's Uttar Pradesh unit and in 1999 became the Union Cabinet Minister for Surface Transport.

== Chief Minister of Uttar Pradesh (2000–02) ==
In 2000, he became chief minister of Uttar Pradesh and was twice elected as MLA from Haidergarh in 2001 and 2002. He was preceded by Ram Prakash Gupta and succeeded by Mayawati after 56 days of President's rule. He was also the last chief minister of Undivided U.P. Contributing to his appointment as state minister were his prior experience as education minister and his grassroots support from his involvement in the anti-corruption JP Movement in the 1970s. At that time there also many leaders in BJP from Uttar Pradesh, but very few had a strong support at the ground level. He was at that time very much close to Atal Bihari Vajpayee and had a very clean image among the people of the State. He also popular among Rajputs (Thakur), a significant community in the state, like Bhairon Singh Shekhawat. Even unlike, L. K. Advani and Kalyan Singh, he was not a leader of Firebrand Hindutva ideology and was a very soft-spoken person.

=== Notable reforms as chief minister ===
As chief minister of Uttar Pradesh, he accused the Samajwadi Party of favouring certain communities for jobs. Singh had said that discrimination in job opportunities should end in the state. He tried to rationalise the reservation structure in government jobs by introducing the most Backward Classes among the OBC and SC, so that the reservation system could favour those at the bottom of society.

When Singh took office as chief minister, Uttar Pradesh had the highest state crime rate in India. Singh thus made establishing law and order a key part of his policy. However, after the 2002 Gujarat riots a large portion of the Indian public saw the BJP as complicit in the riots, which undermined the image of Singh's party and contributed to the loss of his position.

On 7 February 2001, Singh inaugurated the DND Flyway which connects Delhi to Noida.

=== Resignation ===
In the year 2002, Singh resigned from the position of chief minister after a 2-year tenure because at that time, the state BJP Government held only a minority government. After his resignation, the state was under President's rule for 56 days, until the 14th Legislative Assembly appointed Mayawati to the position of chief minister for the 3rd time.

== Rise in national politics ==
=== Union Agriculture Minister (2003–04) ===
In 2003, Singh was appointed as the Minister of Agriculture and subsequently for Food Processing in the NDA Government led by Atal Bihari Vajpayee, and was faced with the difficult task of maintaining one of the most volatile areas of India's economy. During this period he initiated a few epoch-making projects including the Kisan Call Centre and Farm Income Insurance Scheme. He brought down interest rates on Agriculture loans and also established Farmer Commission and initiated Farms Income Insurance Scheme.

=== National President of the BJP ===
==== First time (2005–2009) ====
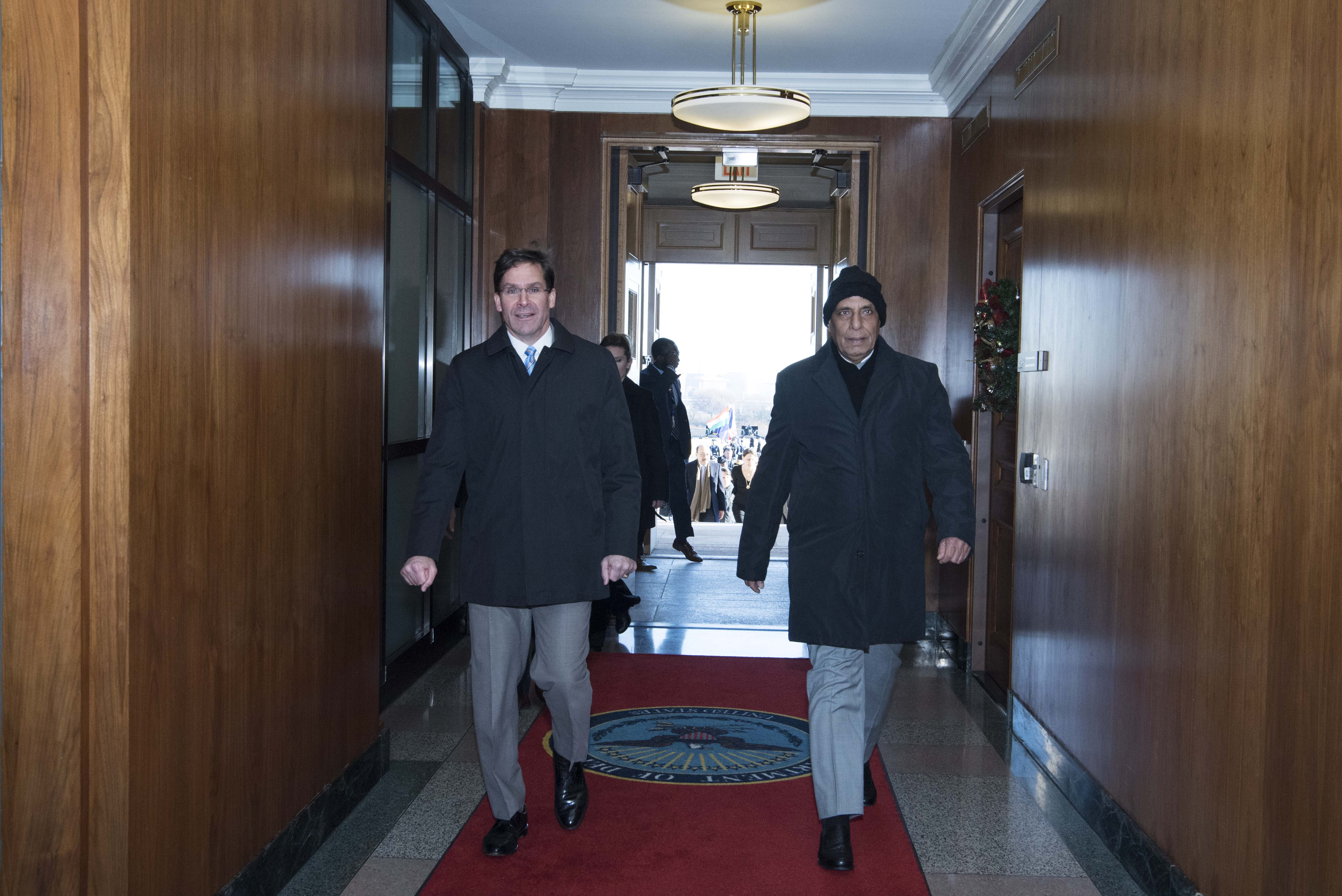
Singh in Washington at a summit.

After the BJP lost power in the 2004 general elections, it was forced to sit in the Opposition. After the resignation of prominent figure Lal Krishna Advani due to controversial statements over Muhammad Ali Jinnah, and the murder of strategist Pramod Mahajan, Singh sought to rebuild the party by focusing on the most basic Hindutva ideologies. He announced his position of "no compromise" in relation to the building of a Ram Temple in Ayodhya at any cost and commended the rule of Vajpayee as Prime Minister, pointing towards all the developments the NDA made for the ordinary people of India. He also criticised the role of the English language in India, claiming that most of Indian population is unable to participate in Indian economy and cultural discourse due to extreme preferences shown to English at the expense of native languages. Singh also suspended Jaswant Singh from the party for praising Jinnah and disrespecting the policies of Jawaharlal Nehru, which also led to a wave of controversies as Jaswant Singh was a very senior leader of the party. Singh had held many positions for the RSS and the BJP, including serving as the Chief Minister of Uttar Pradesh and the President of the BJP's youth wing. He advocated a return to a Hindutva platform. Singh resigned after the NDA lost the 2009 Indian general election.

He became the BJP National President on 31 December 2005, a post he held till 19 December 2009. In May 2009, he was elected MP from Ghaziabad in Uttar Pradesh. . A bold move that will brighten Rajnath Singh's chances of winning from Ghaziabad Loksabha seat, Hundreds of Muslims joined BJP under the leadership of Raja Matin Nuri held a grand sabha in muslim dominated area Masoori, Dasna programme was also attended by Shri M. Venkaiah Naidu Senior BJP Leader, Member of Parliament in the Rajya Sabha and Shri Shahnawaz hussain that time BJP Minority Morcha President. Raja Matin Nuri also said "We have joined BJP with a hope for the better future."

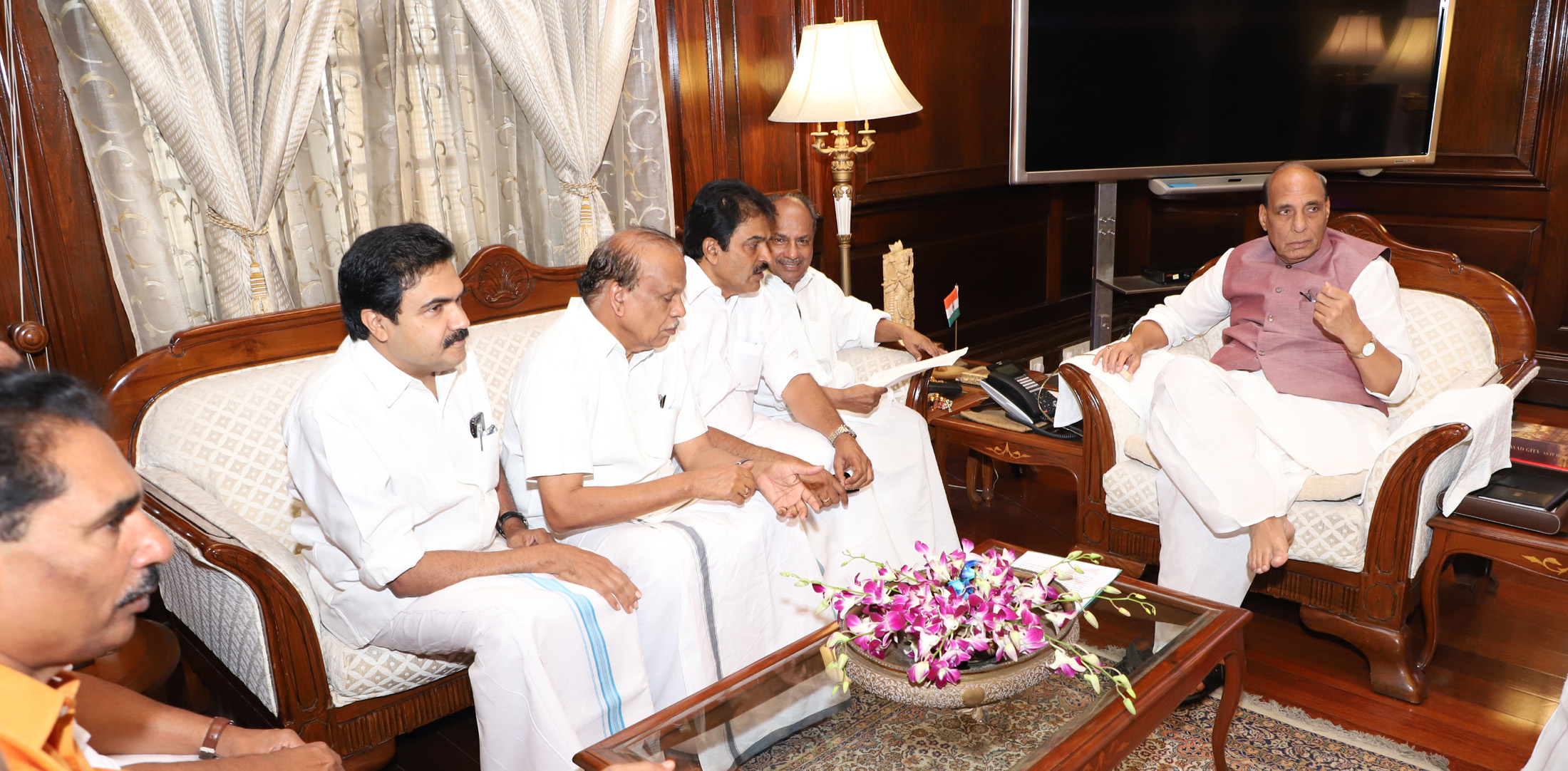
A delegation of Rajnath Singh in Kerala with former Ministry of Defence of India, A. K. Antony and Alphons Kannanthanam.

==== Second time (2013–2014) ====
On 24 January 2013, following the resignation of Nitin Gadkari due to corruption charges, Singh was re-elected as the BJP's National President.

Singh was on record shortly after the law Section 377 of the Indian Penal Code was re-instated in 2013, claiming that his party is "unambiguously" in favour of the law, also claiming that "We will state (at an all-party meeting if it is called) that we support Section 377 because we believe that homosexuality is an unnatural act and cannot be supported." Singh was elected president for his second term after Gadkari stepped down in 2013. Singh played a large role in the BJP's campaign for the 2014 Indian general election, including declaring Narendra Modi the party's Prime Ministerial candidate despite opposition from within the BJP. After the party's landslide victory, Singh resigned the party presidency to assume the position of Home Minister.

He contested the 2014 Lok Sabha elections from Lucknow constituency and was subsequently elected as a Member of the Parliament.

== Union Home Minister (2014–19) ==
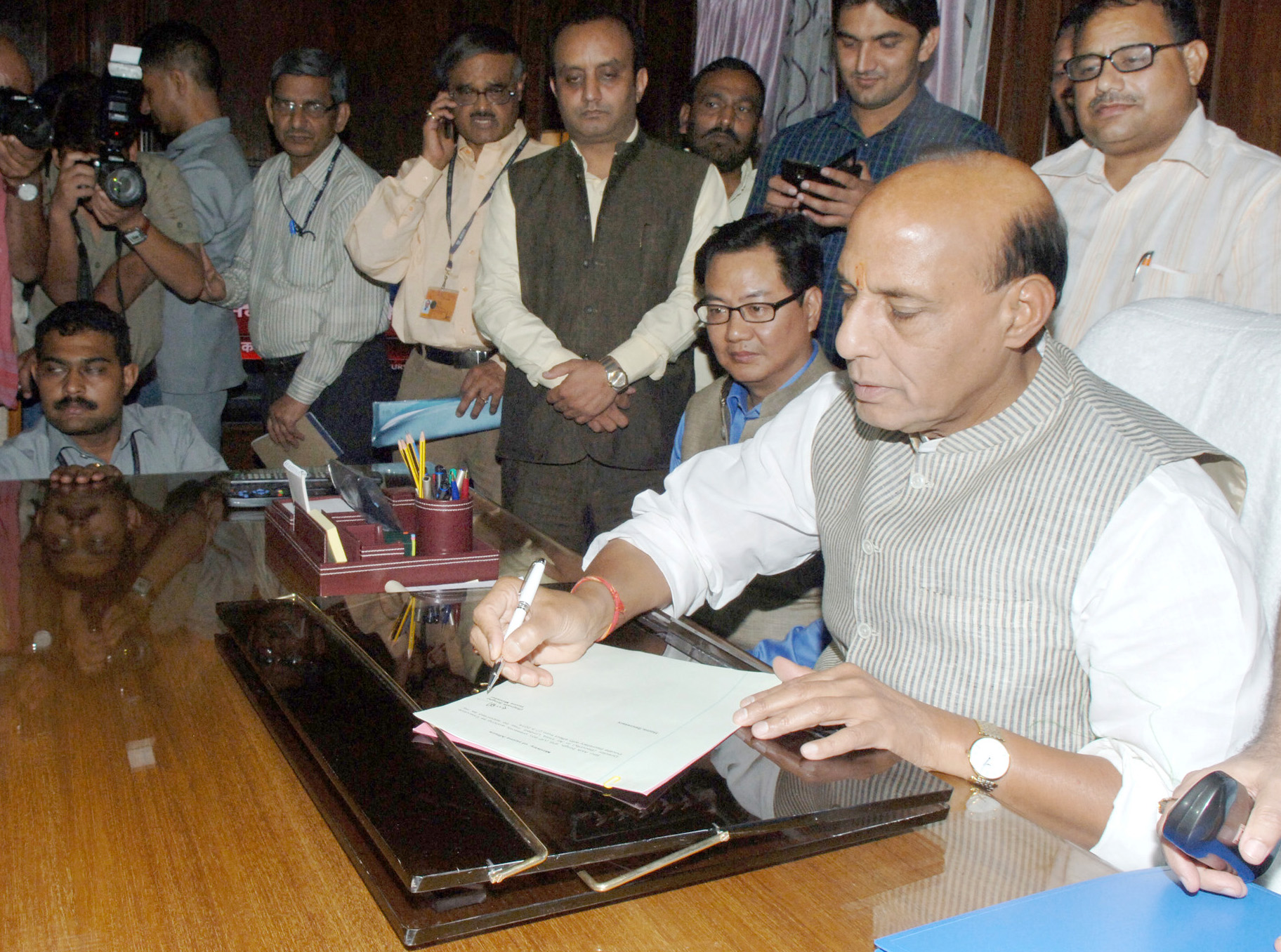
Singh taking charge as the Union Minister for Home Affairs, in New Delhi on 29 May 2014.

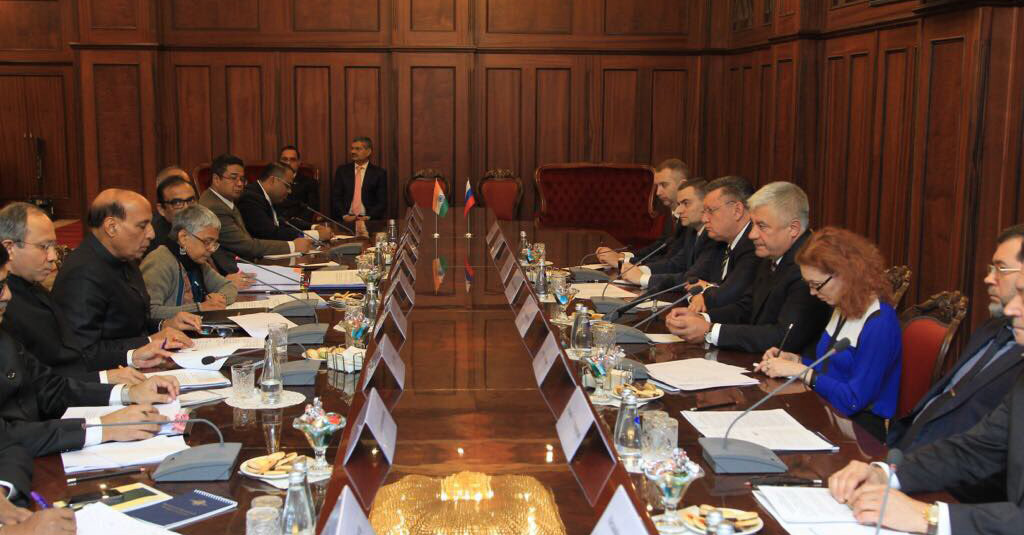
Singh holding a bilateral meeting with Russian delegation led by the Minister for Internal Affairs of the Russian Federation, Vladimir Kolokolstsev, in Moscow

Rajnath Singh was appointed the Union Minister of Home Affairs in the Narendra Modi government and was sworn in on 26 May 2014. At the time he was the former president of the party and was the one who named Narendra Modi as the prime ministerial candidate for the party. After the win of the party in 2014 Lok Sabha election he took over the position from Sushilkumar Shinde as the Minister of Home Affairs from the year 2014–2019. He has also been the current Deputy Leader of Lok Sabha since 2019.

=== JNU incident ===
Singh triggered controversy amid the protests over the police action at Jawaharlal Nehru University (JNU), on 14 February 2016, claiming that the "JNU incident" was supported by Lashkar-e-Taiba chief Hafiz Saeed. He gave the statement in the backdrop of anti-national speeches in JNU related to the hanging anniversary of Kashmiri Separist Maqbool Bhat and Afzal Guru on 9 February 2016. After the statement there were protests against Singh. After the arrests of Umar Khalid and Kanhaiya Kumar, he met with many leaders from the left.

=== Infiltration ===
In May 2016, he claimed that infiltration from Pakistan declined by 52% in a period of two years.

=== Bharat Ke Veer App ===
On 9 April 2017, he launched Bharat Ke Veer web portal and application with Bollywood actor Akshay Kumar. This was an initiative taken by him for the welfare of martyrs' family. Bharat Ke Veer is a fund-raising initiative by the Ministry of Home Affairs, Government of India on behalf of members of the Indian paramilitary forces. Singh himself praised the app and was its first donor. An official anthem was launched on 20 January 2018 by him along with film star Akshay Kumar, and other ministers Kiren Rijiju and Hansraj Ahir.

=== Doklam matter ===
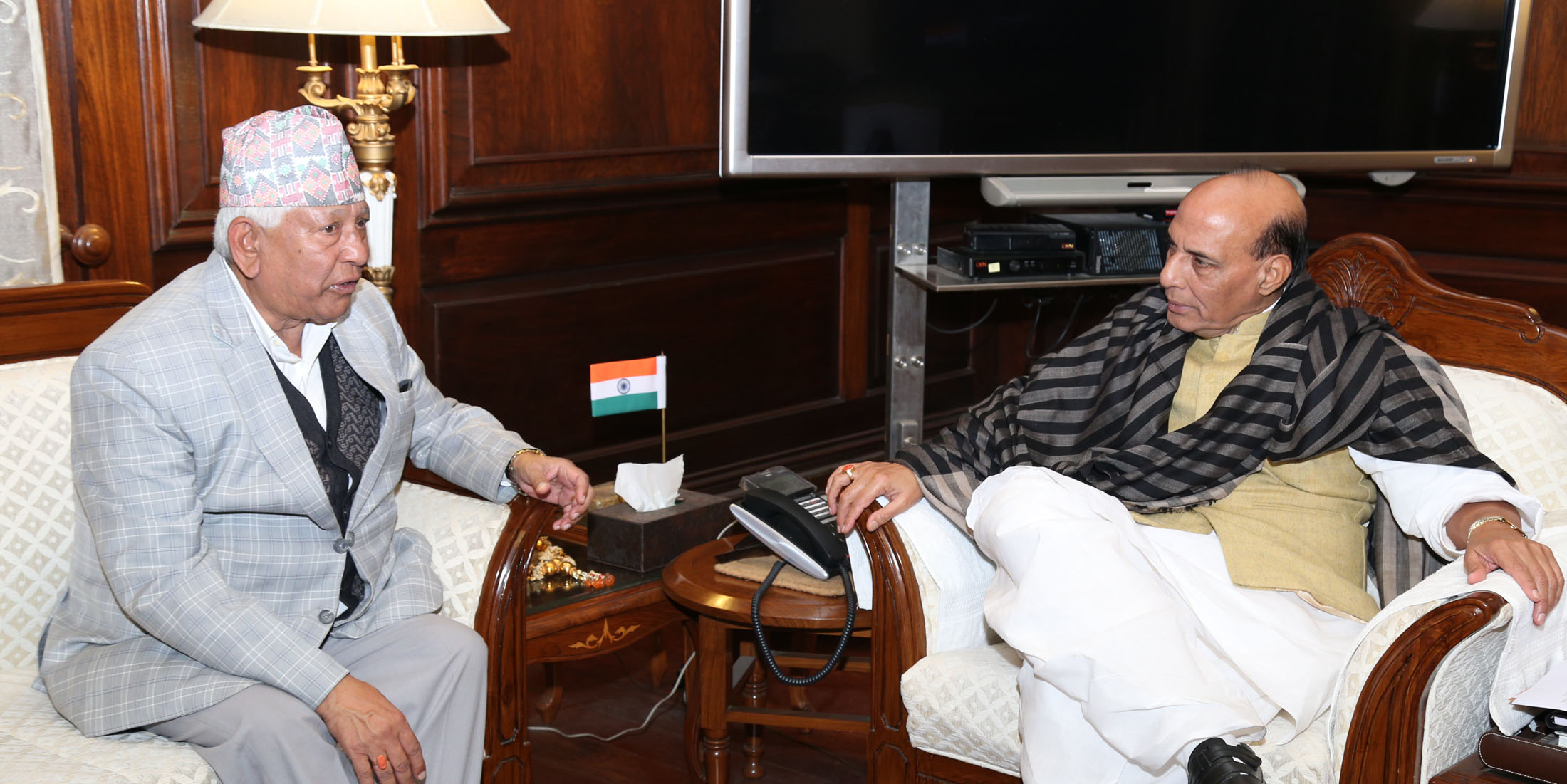
Urban Development Minister of Nepal, Arjun Narsingh K.C. calling on the Singh, in New Delhi

Doklam is a disputed territory between Bhutan and China. In June 2017, in this disputed territory, China attempted to construct a road. The Indian Army stepped-in on behalf of Bhutan resulting in a border standoff with the People's Liberation Army of China. The Doklam area is also strategically important for India due to its proximity with the Siliguri Corridor. As home minister, Singh co-chaired an all-party meeting related to the standoff on 15 July 2017. On 21 August 2017, speaking to the Indo-Tibetan Border Police (ITBP), Rajnath Singh stated that India wanted peace with its neghbours but was ready to fight for its territory; he also said that "There will be a solution soon and I am sure China will make a positive move." The standoff ended a week later.

=== Commissioning of Bastariya Battalion ===
On 21 May 2018, he commissioned Bastariya Battalion. As Union Home Minister, Rajnath Singh attended the passing out parade of 241 Bastariya Battalion of CRPF in Ambikapur, Chhattisgarh on 21 May 2018.

== Union Defence Minister (2019–present) ==
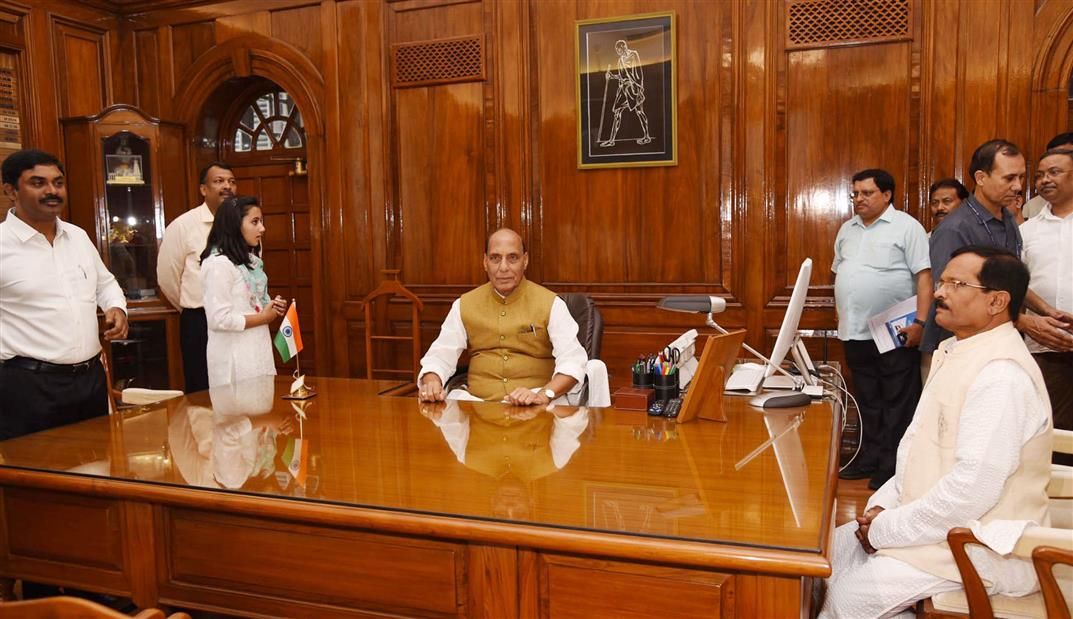
Rajnath Singh taking charge as the Union Minister for Defence, in the presence of Shripad Naik, Minister of State for Defence, in New Delhi on 1 June 2019.

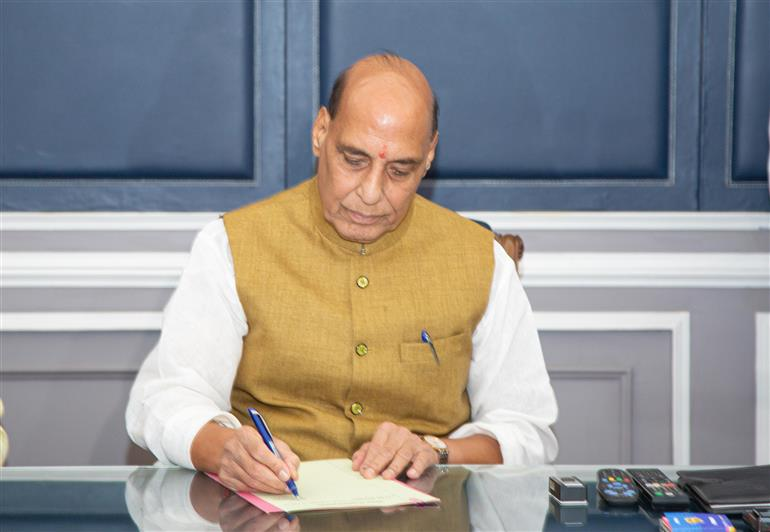
Rajnath Singh takes office as the Minister of Defense of India for the second consecutive term, in New Delhi on 13 June 2024.

Singh became the defence minister of India on 31 May 2019. Among the challenges that the Defence Minister is expected to address are the ever-increasing requirements of India's forces, including increased budgetary requirements, especially in the light of an unstable neighbourhood. As Union Defence Minister, Singh has indicated a subtle shift in India's strategic vision; this includes a focus on decreasing the import of weapons and making the nation an arms exporter with an arms industry. He has supported various reforms including those for greater representiation of women in the defence services.

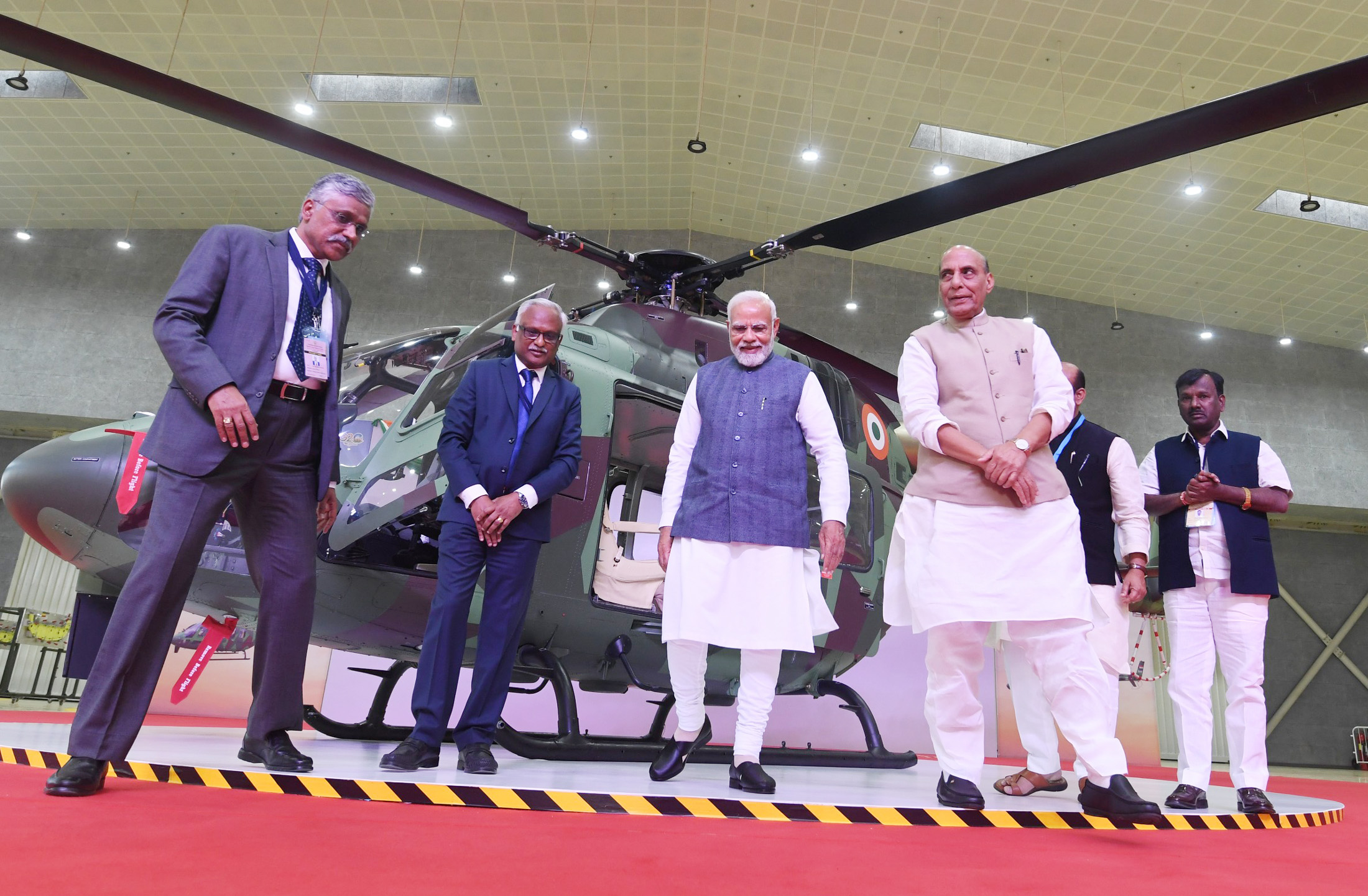
Singh, along with Prime Minister Modi inaugurates Asia's largest helicopter manufacturing sector (HAL) at Tumkur, in Karnataka in 2023.

=== Rafale fighter plane ===
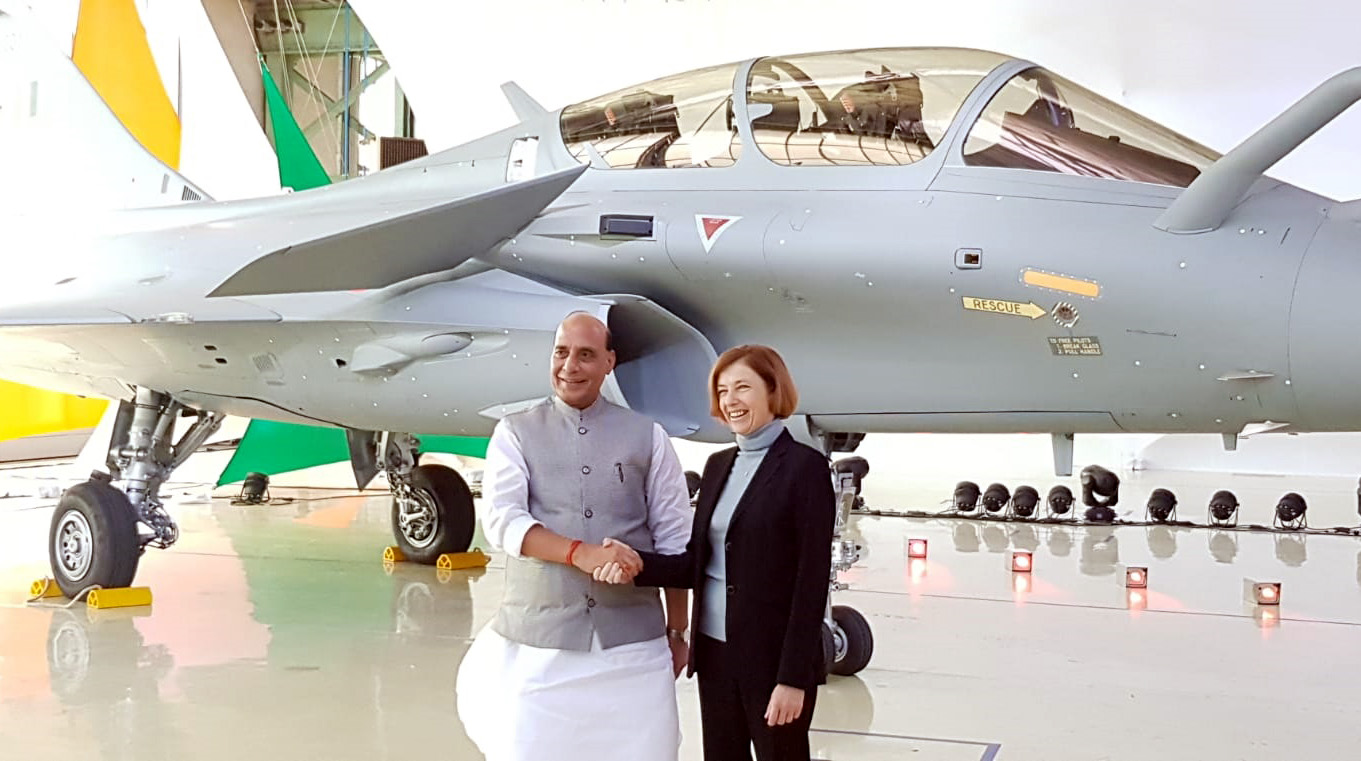
Singh with the French Minister of Armed Forces, Florence Parly

Dassault Rafale is a fighter plane of French origin whose deal was signed by then Minister of Defence, Manohar Parrikar, in 2016 to increase the strength of the Indian Air Force. The Government of India had signed to buy 126 fighter jets costing $30 billion.

The planes were received during Rajnath Singh's tenure as the defence minister. Though a controversial issue, Singh completed the deal after becoming defence minister; the Indian Air Force received its first Dassault Rafale on 8 October 2019 and he personally went to France to receive it. The first fleet of 5 fighter jets landed at Ambala Air Force Station in July 2020. Singh said that "Those wanting to threaten India's territorial integrity should be worried about its new capability." The further procurement of 26 more Rafales (22 single-seater and 4 double-seater) for the Indian Navy was signed on 28 April 2025.

=== Indo-China border tension ===
Rajnath Singh on Galwan

China made transgression attempts on Line of Actual Control (LAC) in the western sector. This includes Kongka, Gogra, and the north bank of Pangong Lake. Our Army took necessary action against these attempts.

— Singh.

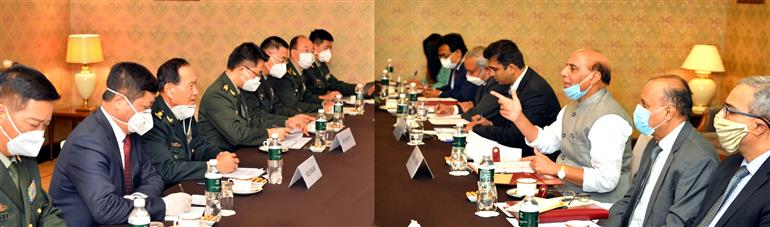
Rajnath Singh at talks between Indian and Chinese officials during the 2020 standoff

Starting May 2020, there was tension between the security forces of India and China over the border region of Ladakh. As Defence Minister, Rajnath Singh said that there is a bilateral mechanism for such a situation and that third party mediation was not required. He also compared the situation to the 2017 Doklam standoff, saying that despite its seriousness at the time, the issue was resolved.

After the martyrdom of 20 Indian soldiers on 15–16 June 2020 in Galwan Valley, Singh met with the Indian soldiers in eastern Ladakh. He met with the CDS General Bipin Rawat, CNS Admiral Karambir Singh and COAS General Manoj Mukund Naravane to discuss the situation. On 15 July, Singh met with officials of the Indian Army and visited Ladakh, and forward areas of Jammu and Kashmir. Singh said that he can not guarantee to what extent the tension would go on. Singh and his Chinese counterpart General Wei Fenghe held a talk, on 4 September in Moscow, on the sidelines of a Shanghai Cooperation Organisation meeting. General Wei Fenghe said that India was behind the border friction. Singh said that talks must continue and status quo must be restored. Throughout the tensions, multiple talks took place at multiple levels.

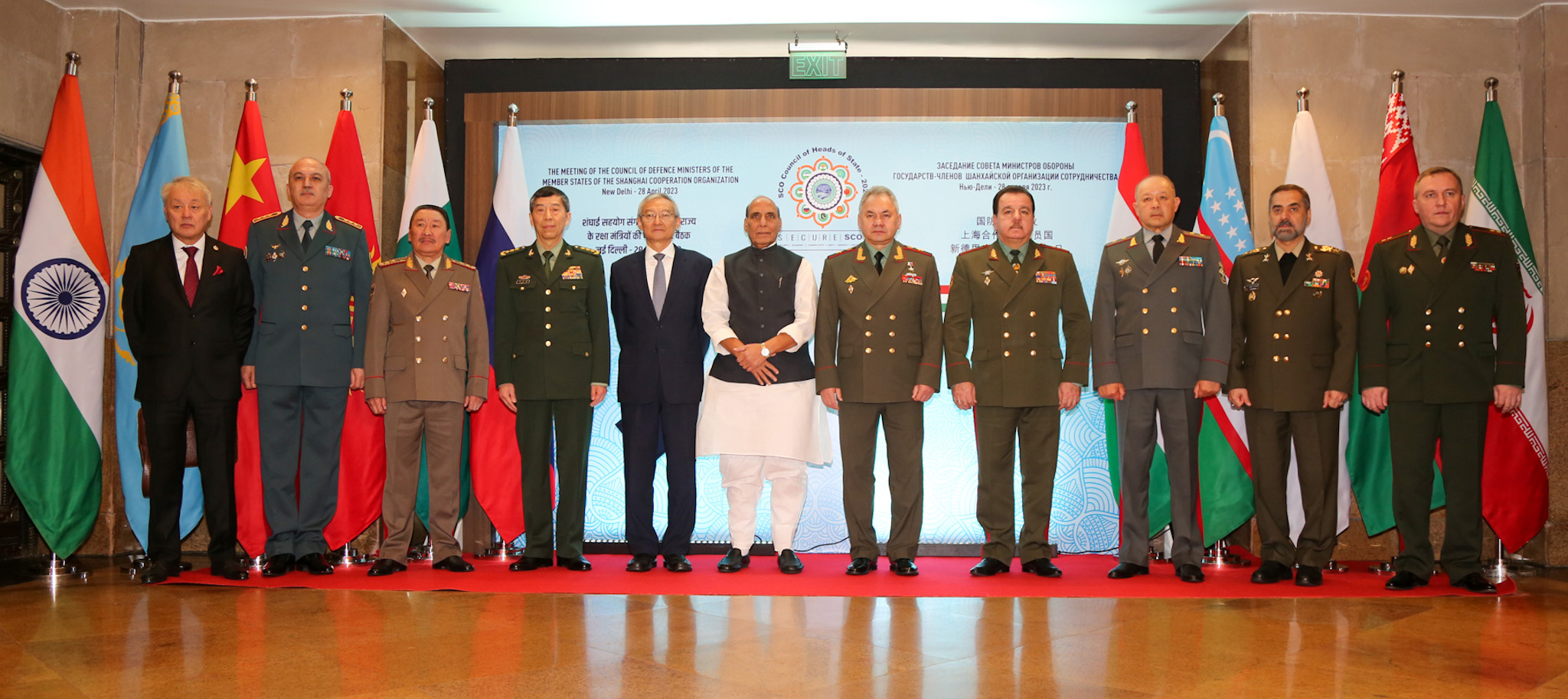
Singh at the SCO defence ministers' meeting in New Delhi on 28 April 2023

On 28 April 2023, Chinese Defense Minister Li Shangfu met with Rajnath Singh as part of the Shanghai Cooperation Organisation defence ministers' meeting in New Delhi, making it the first visit to India by a Chinese Defence Minister since the 2020 border skirmishes. Disengagement was completed by December 2024.

On 26 June 2025, Singh visited China to attend the Shanghai Cooperation Organisation defence ministers' meeting in Qingdao, marking the first visit by a senior Indian minister to China since the 2020 border skirmishes and the first by an Indian Defence Minister in 12 years. During the meeting, Singh refused to sign the joint declaration, citing the document's failure to condemn the 2025 Pahalgam attack in Kashmir, which claimed 26 lives, and lack of alignment with India's stance against terrorism.

=== Russia ===
Rajnath Singh has on multiple occasions supported dialogue and diplomacy as a way towards easing tensions stemming from the Russo-Ukrainian war. He has expressed concern about the humanitarian situation and nuclear posturing.

International military exercises known as Vostok 2022 were launched in Russia's Far East in September 2022, with countries including Russia, India and China taking part in it. On 28 April 2023, Singh met with Russian Minister of Defence Sergei Shoigu.

On 10 December 2024, Singh held talks with Russian Defence Minister Andrey Belousov. Singh reaffirmed India's commitment to strengthening defence ties with Russia.

In a lecture in 2025, as a takeaway from the war, the defence minister stated "In the Ukraine-Russia conflict, drones have virtually emerged as a new arm, if not a transformative science." In 2026, again with reference to the war and drones he stated, "From the drone's molds to its software, engines, and batteries, everything must be manufactured in India."

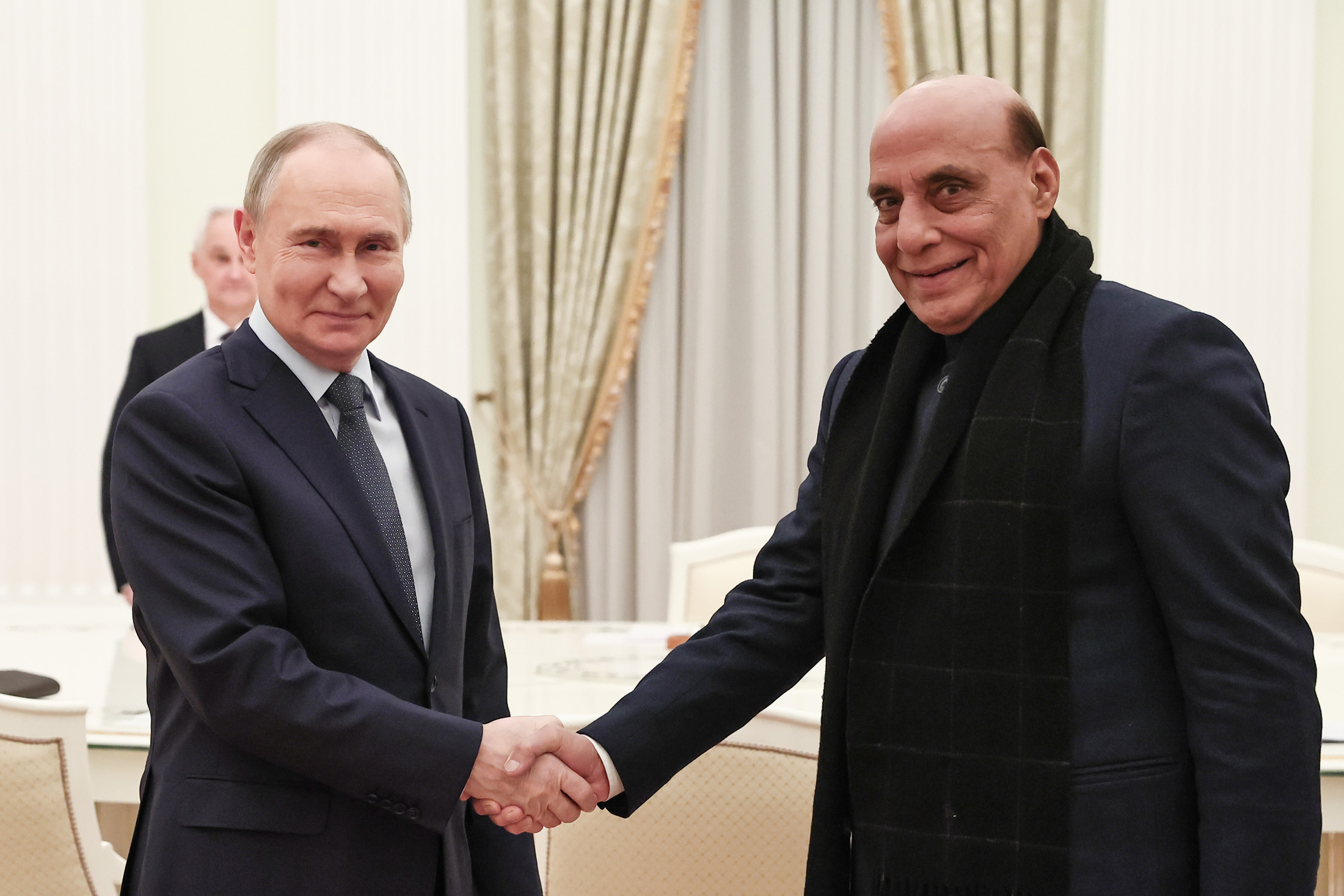
Singh with Russian President Vladimir Putin in Moscow on 10 December 2024

=== Agnipath Scheme ===
The Defence Ministry introduced a "transformative" military recruitment scheme called Agnipath. The recruitment was pursued for all the three forces, and the selected 46,000 candidates were termed as "Agniveers". The scheme faced opposition and various protests were held. Railway property was set on fire and losses were suffered in Bihar, Telangana and West Bengal; the opposition also called it an RSS agenda. The Ministry said it was a long pending reform in the defence field to lower the average age of the military. The Delhi High Court stated that it finds no reason to interfere in the process and that the government has brought in the scheme "in national interest". Singh has called the scheme "successful".

=== 2025 India-Pakistan Conflict ===
The India-Pakistan conflict in 2025 took place between 7–10 May. On 7 May 2025, Rajnath Singh said that India had utilized its "right to respond" by attacking terror infrastructure with "precision, precaution and compassion"; Singh was addressing the Raising Day event of Border Roads Organisation. He stated, "we have followed the ideals of Lord Hanuman. Just as he said during the destruction of Ashok Vatika — 'I only struck those who attacked me' — we too have targeted only those who killed our innocent people." The next day, at the National Quality Conclave, Singh said that "Operation Sindoor was successfully executed because our formidable and professionally-trained armed forces were equipped with high-quality equipment." On 11 May, at the inauguration of a BrahMos centre, Singh said that "Operation Sindoor was not just a military action, but a symbol of India's political, social and strategic willpower." He connected it to India's earlier responses to terrorism, the 2016 Indian Line of Control strike following the Uri attack, and the 2019 Balakot airstrike following the Pulwama attack. On 16 May, at Bhuj Air Force Station, he said that "India’s fight against terrorism is not just a matter of security, it has now become a part of the national defence doctrine, and we will root out this hybrid and proxy warfare". He said Operation Sindoor was not over and could restart. On 20 June, while interacting with soldiers in Udhampur, he reiterated, "Operation Sindoor is not over yet. This is just a pause. I want to tell this to my neighbouring country."

In July 2025, Rajnath Singh, addressing the Indian parliament, rejected US President Donald Trump's claim that the United States had mediated the ceasefire between India and Pakistan in May, stating that India had not acted under any external pressure. Singh clarified that military operations, launched in response to the 2025 Pahalgam attack, ceased only after all political and military objectives were achieved. He further stated that the decision to halt "Operation Sindoor" followed a request from Pakistan's Director General of Military Operations, who sought relief from continued hostilities. Trump has taken credit for the ceasefire on over 40 different occasions.

In November 2025, he said that "tomorrow Sindh may return to India again."

=== RAKSHA ===
On 3 September 2026, Singh released RAKSHA, a ten year framework for defence diplomacy.

== Positions and offices ==
=== Offices held ===
| S. No | Office | Constituency | Term |
|---|---|---|---|
| 1. | MLA in Uttar Pradesh Legislative Assembly | Mirzapur | 1977-1980 |
| 2. | Member of Legislative Council (MLC) | Uttar Pradesh | 1988-1994 |
| 3. | MP in Rajya Sabha | Uttar Pradesh | 1994-2000 |
| 4. | MP in Rajya Sabha | Uttar Pradesh | 2000-2000 |
| 5. | MLA in Uttar Pradesh Legislative Assembly | Haidergarh (by-elections) | 2001-2002 |
| 6. | MLA in Uttar Pradesh Legislative Assembly | Haidergarh | 2002-2002 |
| 7. | MP in Rajya Sabha | Uttar Pradesh | 2002-2008 |
| 8. | MP in 15th Lok Sabha | Ghaziabad | 2009-2014 |
| 9. | MP in 16th Lok Sabha | Lucknow | 2014-2019 |
| 10. | MP in 17th Lok Sabha | Lucknow | 2019-2024 |
| 11 | MP in 18th Lok Sabha | Lucknow | 2024- |

=== Positions held ===
| S. No. | Position | Tenure | Preceded by | Succeeded by |
|---|---|---|---|---|
| 1. | President of BJP Youth Wing (Uttar Pradesh) | 1984–1986 | — | — |
| 2. | National General Secretary BJP Youth Wing | 1986–1988 | — | — |
| 3. | National President of BJP Youth Wing | 1988–1989 | Pramod Mahajan | J. P. Nadda |
| 4. | Education Minister of Uttar Pradesh | 1991–1992 | — | — |
| 5. | President of BJP Uttar Pradesh | 1997–1998 | Kalraj Mishra | Om Prakash Singh |
| 6. | Union Minister of Transportation. | 1999–2000 | Nitish Kumar | B. C. Khanduri |
| 7. | Chief Minister of Uttar Pradesh | 2000–2002 | Ram Prakash Gupta | President- rule (then Mayawati) |
| 8. | Union Agriculture Minister | 2003–2004 | Ajit Singh | Sharad Pawar |
| 9. | President of BJP | 2005–2009 | L. K. Advani | Nitin Gadkari |
| 10. | President of BJP | 2012–2014 | Nitin Gadkari | Amit Shah |
| 11. | Minister of Home Affairs of India | 2014–2019 | Sushilkumar Shinde | Amit Shah |
| 12. | Minister of Defence of India | 2019–Incumbent | Nirmala Sitharaman | Incumbent |

== Personal life ==
He married Savitri Singh on 5 June 1971, with whom he has two sons and a daughter. His son Pankaj Singh is a politician and Member of the Legislative Assembly from Noida, Uttar Pradesh from BJP. Singh is a devout Hindu and a religious man and is known for soft-spoken behaviour.

== See also ==
- Yogi Adityanath

== Bibliography ==
- Singh, Rajnath (2019). Rajneeti A biography of Rajnath Singh (PDF). GOI. pp. 1–2. ISBN 978-0670092369. Archived (PDF) from the original on 22 October 2020.
- Chintamani, Gautam (2019). Rajneeti: A Biography of Rajnath Singh. New Delhi, India: Penguin Books. p. 304. ISBN 978-0670092369. Archived from the original on 23 October 2020.
- "Rajnath Singh". Parliament of India. GOI. Archived from the original on 9 August 2019.

Political offices
| Preceded by Ram Prakash Gupta | Chief Minister of Uttar Pradesh; 2000–2002 | Succeeded by Mayawati |
| Preceded by Ajit Singh | Union Minister of Agriculture; 2003–2004 | Succeeded by Sharad Pawar |
| Preceded by Sushilkumar Shinde | Union Minister of Home Affairs; 2014–2019 | Succeeded by Amit Shah |
| Preceded by Nirmala Sitharaman | Union Minister of Defence; 2019–present | Incumbent |
Party political offices
| Preceded by L. K. Advani | National President of the Bharatiya Janata Party; 2005–2009 | Succeeded by Nitin Gadkari |
| Preceded by Nitin Gadkari | National President of the Bharatiya Janata Party; 2013–2014 | Succeeded by Amit Shah |
