= Gopalpur, Mirzapur =

Village in Uttar Pradesh, India

Coordinates: 25.170°N 82.483°E

Gopalpur is a village in Mirzapur, Uttar Pradesh, India.
