= Karaljhar =

Village in Uttar Pradesh, India

Karaljhar is a village in Mirzapur, Uttar Pradesh, India.
