= Umakant Mishra =

Indian politician (1927–2024)

Member of the Lok Sabha
- In office 1981–1989
- Preceded by: Aziz Imam
- Succeeded by: Yusuf Beg
- Constituency: Mirzapur

Member of the Uttar Pradesh Legislative Council
- In office 1974–1981

Personal details
- Born: 15 December 1927 Baraunda, Mirzapur district, United Provinces, British India(present-day Uttar Pradesh, India)
- Died: 8 May 2014 (aged 86)
- Party: Indian National Congress
- Spouse: Maya Devi Mishra (m. 1949)
- Parent: Yagya Narain Mishra (father)
- Website: https://loksabha.nic.in/writereaddata/biodata_1_12/2793.htm

Umakant Mishra (15 December 1927 – 8 May 2014) was an Indian politician. He was elected to the Lok Sabha, lower house of the Parliament of India as a member of the Indian National Congress.

Mishra died on 8 May 2014, at the age of 86.
