= Kothara Mistran =

Village in Uttar Pradesh, India

Kothara Mistran is a village in Mirzapur, Uttar Pradesh, India.
