= Noohigaharwar =

Village in Uttar Pradesh, India

Noohigaharwar is a village in Mirzapur, Uttar Pradesh, India.
