= Jogwa, Uttar Pradesh =

Village in Uttar Pradesh, India

Jogwa is a village in Mirzapur, Uttar Pradesh, India.
