= Chhitampatti =

- Village
- Location within Uttar Pradesh Location within India
- Coordinates: 25.15°N 82.60°E
- Country: India
- State: Uttar Pradesh

Government
  - Body: Gram panchayat
- Elevation: 80 m (260 ft)

Population (2011)
  - Village: 233,691
  - Density: 350/km^{2} (910/sq mi)
  - Metro: 522

Languages
  - Official: Hindi, Awadhi, Bhojpuri, English
- Time zone: UTC+5:30 (IST)
- PIN: 231001
- Telephone code: 05442
- Vehicle registration: UP 63
- Sex ratio: 819 (2011)
- Literacy: 78.13% (2011) (91.88%♂; 62.44%♀)

Chhitampatti is a small village on the bank of the Ganges in the Mirzapur district of Uttar Pradesh, India, 12 km north-east to Mirzapur district headquarters.

== Chhitampatti Data ==
According to the 2011 Census, Chhitampatti data are as under:

Particulars	Total	Male	Female
1. Total No. of Houses	67		
2. Population	522	287	235
3. Child (0-6)	83	53	30
4. Schedule Caste	133	70	63
5. Schedule Tribe	0	0	0
6. Literacy	78.13 %	91.88 %	62.44 %
7. Total Workers	214	169	45
8. Main Worker	141	0	0
9. Marginal Worker	73	52	21
