= Rateh =

Village in Uttar Pradesh, India

Rateh is a village in Mirzapur, Uttar Pradesh, India. It is also market area for people of nearby villages.This market is well known for buying clothes, groceries, snacks and many more things.
