= Visundarpur Bara Sakhaura =

Village in Uttar Pradesh, India

Visundarpur Bara Sakhaura is a village in Mirzapur, Uttar Pradesh, India.
