= Mangarwari =

Village in Uttar Pradesh, India

Mangarwari is a village in Mirzapur, Uttar Pradesh, India.
