= Gogao =

Village in Uttar Pradesh, India

Gogao is a village in Mirzapur, Uttar Pradesh, India.
