= Kon Bharahua =

Village in Uttar Pradesh, India

Kon Bharahua is a village in Mirzapur, Uttar Pradesh, India.
