= Tarakapur Harijan Basti =

Village in Uttar Pradesh, India

Tarakapur Harijan Basti is a village in Mirzapur, Uttar Pradesh, India.
