= Chhatha =

Village in Uttar Pradesh, India

Coordinates: 25.162518395670638°N 82.7106391879306°E

Chhatha is a village in Mirzapur, Uttar Pradesh, India.
