= Kewatabeer =

Village in Uttar Pradesh, India

Kewatabeer is a village in Mirzapur, Uttar Pradesh, India.
