= Mirzapur Assembly constituency =

Constituency of the Uttar Pradesh legislative assembly in India

Coordinates: 25.14°N 82.57°E

Mirzapur
- Constituency No. 396 for the Uttar Pradesh Legislative Assembly

Constituency details
- Country: India
- Region: North India
- State: Uttar Pradesh
- District: Mirzapur
- Lok Sabha constituency: Mirzapur
- Total electors: 403,374
- Reservation: None

Member of Legislative Assembly
- 18th Uttar Pradesh Legislative Assembly
- Incumbent Ratnakar Mishra
- Party: Bharatiya Janata Party
- Elected year: 2022

Mirzapur is a constituency of the Uttar Pradesh Legislative Assembly covering the city of Mirzapur in the Mirzapur district of Uttar Pradesh, India.

Mirzapur is one of five assembly segments under Mirzapur Lok Sabha constituency. Since 2008, this assembly constituency is numbered 396 amongst 403 constituencies.

== Members of Vidhan Sabha ==
Year	Member	Party
1957	Amresh Chand	Indian National Congress
1962	Bhagwan Das	Bharatiya Jana Sangh
1967		Samyukta Socialist Party
1969	Vijai Bahadur Singh	Bharatiya Jana Sangh
1974	Asha Ram Yadav	Bharatiya Jana Sangh
1977	Rajnath Singh	Janata Party
1980	Azahar Imam	Indian National Congress (I)
1985	Asraf Iman	Indian National Congress
1989	Sarjeet Singh Dang	Bharatiya Janata Party
1991	Sarjeet Singh Dang	Bharatiya Janata Party
1993	Sarjeet Singh Dang	Bharatiya Janata Party
1996	Sarjeet Singh Dang	Bharatiya Janata Party
2002	Kailash Nath Chaurasiya	Samajwadi Party
2007	Kailash Nath Chaurasiya	Samajwadi Party
2012	Kailash Nath Chaurasiya	Samajwadi Party
2017	Ratnakar Mishra	Bharatiya Janata Party
2022	Ratnakar Mishra	Bharatiya Janata Party

== Election results ==
Vote share of winning candidates
2022	52.09%
2017	48.48%

=== 2027 ===
2027 Uttar Pradesh Legislative Assembly election: Mirzapur
Party	Candidate	Votes	%	±%
INDIA				
NDA				
BSP				
NOTA	None of the above			
Majority				
Turnout				
gain from		Swing		

=== 2022 ===
2022 Uttar Pradesh Legislative Assembly election: Mirzapur
Party	Candidate	Votes	%	±%
BJP	Ratnakar Mishra	118,642	52.09	+3.61
SP	Kailash Chaurasiya	78,766	34.58	+11.59
BSP	Rajesh Kumar Pandey	19,529	8.57	−13.61
INC	Akash Kumar Jaiswal	3,674	1.61	
NOTA	None of the above	1,758	0.77	+0.18
Majority		39,876	17.51	−7.98
Turnout		227,751	56.46	−2.03
BJP hold		Swing		

=== 2017 ===
Bharatiya Janta Party candidate Ratnakar Mishra won in 2017 Uttar Pradesh Legislative Elections defeating Samajwadi Party candidate Kailash Chaurasiya by a margin of votes.

2017 Uttar Pradesh Legislative Assembly election: Mirzapur
Party	Candidate	Votes	%	±%
BJP	Ratnakar Mishra	109,196	48.48	
SP	Kailash Chaurasiya	51,784	22.99	
BSP	Mohd Parvez Khan	49,955	22.18	
Independent	Sanshkar Agrawal (Golu)	2,275	1.01	
NOTA	None of the above	1,327	0.59	
Majority		57,412	25.49	
Turnout		225,234	58.49	
BJP gain from SP		Swing		

=== 1980 ===
- Azahar Imam (INC-I) : 26,866 votes
- Rajnath (BJP) : 15,206

=== 1962 ===
- Bhagwan Das (JS) : 21,622 votes
- Amresh Chand (INC) : 21,321
