= Lalitesh Pati Tripathi =

Indian politician

- Symbol of Trinamool Congress

Member of Uttar Pradesh Legislative Assembly
- In office 2012–2017
- Succeeded by: Rama Shankar Singh
- Constituency: Marihan

Personal details
- Relatives: Kamalapati Tripathi (grandfather)
- Education: Graduate (B.Sc. Business and Management Studies)
- Alma mater: IILM Institute for Higher Education

Lalitesh Pati Tripathi is an Indian politician. He is a member of National Working Committee of All India Trinamool Congress. He was the candidate of INDIA Alliance from Bhadohi Lok Sabha constituency of Uttar Pradesh in 2024 Indian general election. He was a member of the Uttar Pradesh Legislative Assembly from 2012 to 2017, elected from Marihan. He was a member of the Indian National Congress and vice-president of the Uttar Pradesh Congress Committee. He left Congress in 2021 and took up the symbol of Trinamool Congress. He is the grandson of former Chief Minister Kamalpati Tripathi (1905–1990).
