= Shyam Dhar Mishra =

Former Indian politician

Member of Parliament, Rajya Sabha
- In office 1952–1962 ,1968–1974
- Constituency: Uttar Pradesh

Member of Parliament, Lok Sabha
- In office 1962–1967
- Preceded by: John N. Wilson
- Succeeded by: Bansh Narain Singh
- Constituency: Mizrapur, Uttar Pradesh

Personal details
- Born: 26 May 1919 Kathauta, Gopi Ganj, Varanasi, United Provinces of Agra and Oudh, British India
- Died: 2 November 2001 (aged 82)
- Party: Indian National Congress

Shyam Dhar Mishra (1919–2001) was an Indian politician. He was a Member of Parliament, representing Uttar Pradesh in the Rajya Sabha the upper house of India's Parliament representing the Indian National Congress.
