= Uttar Pradesh Heritage Arc =

The Heritage ARC – Uttar Pradesh Tourism
- Type: Ensemble of memorable sites
- Location: Agra district, Lucknow district, and Varanasi district in Uttar Pradesh, India

Site notes
- Length: approx. 645 km (400 miles)
- Website: uptourism.gov.in/post/heritage-arc

The Uttar Pradesh Heritage Arc is a tourist circuit stretching from Agra to Lucknow and Varanasi in India, covering an area of approximately 700 km.

== History ==
The idea was conceived by the Government of Uttar Pradesh under the leadership of then Chief Minister of Uttar Pradesh Akhilesh Yadav in 2014, aiming to boost tourism in the state. The Arc was established on 24 February 2015.

== Introduction ==
The Uttar Pradesh government created the Heritage Arc as a tourist route to show and promote state's rich cultural and historical inheritance. The three main cities on the route are:

- Agra: Taj Mahal, Agra Fort, and Fatehpur Sikri.
- Lucknow: Awadhi culture, colonial past, Rumi Darwaza and Bara Imambara.
- Varanasi: Temples, Ghats, spiritual significance, and rich cultural customs.

== Berlin delegation, March 2015 ==
The Minister for Tourism, Om Prakash Singh, led a delegation of senior officers to create awareness of Uttar Pradesh's tourism-friendly policies and initiatives, and to conduct meetings with industry professionals.

== Uttar Pradesh Travel Mart ==
The Uttar Pradesh Travel Mart 2015 was a government initiative that had UP Tourism as its face in coordination with Federation of Indian Chambers of Commerce & Industry (FICCI). The first edition held at Lucknow on 22–24 February looks at the promotion of strategic areas of tourism in a substantial way for the state. The motive behind the event has been to lay the ground for initial dialogue and interaction through B2B session wherein the foreign delegates gets to have on-hand experience of not only the destination product but also the subsidiaries, infra-structure, hotel industry, transport and other ancillary service providers.
