= Chunar Assembly constituency =

Constituency of the Uttar Pradesh legislative assembly in India

Coordinates: 25.10°N 82.87°E

Chunar
- Constituency No. 398 for the Uttar Pradesh Legislative Assembly

Constituency details
- Country: India
- Region: North India
- State: Uttar Pradesh
- District: Mirzapur
- Total electors: 3,54,274
- Reservation: None

Member of Legislative Assembly
- 18th Uttar Pradesh Legislative Assembly
- Incumbent Anurag Singh
- Party: Bharatiya Janta Party
- Elected year: 2017

Chunar is a constituency of the Uttar Pradesh Legislative Assembly covering the city of Chunar in the Mirzapur district of Uttar Pradesh, India.

Chunar is one of five assembly constituencies in the Mirzapur Lok Sabha constituency. Since 2008, this assembly constituency is numbered 398 amongst 403 constituencies. Current MLA from Chunar is Anurag Singh.

== Members of Legislative Assembly ==
Year	Member	Party
1957	Raj Kumar	Indian National Congress
1959^	Onkar Nath	Indian National Congress
1962	Rajnarain Singh	Indian National Congress
1967	Rajnarain Singh	Indian National Congress
1969	Shiva Das	Samyukta Socialist Party
1974	Om Prakash Singh	Bharatiya Jana Sangh
1977	Om Prakash Singh	Janata Party
1980	Yadunath Singh	Janata Party (Secular)
1985	Yadunath Singh	Lokdal
1989	Yadunath Singh	Janata Dal
1991	Yadunath Singh	Janata Dal
1993	Om Prakash Singh	Bharatiya Janata Party
1996	Om Prakash Singh	Bharatiya Janata Party
2002	Om Prakash Singh	Bharatiya Janata Party
2007	Om Prakash Singh	Bharatiya Janata Party
2012	Jagtamba Patel	Samajwadi Party
2017	Anurag Singh	Bharatiya Janata Party
2022	Anurag Singh	Bharatiya Janata Party

== Election results ==
=== 2027 ===
2027 Uttar Pradesh Legislative Assembly election: Chunar
Party	Candidate	Votes	%	±%
INDIA				
NDA				
BSP				
NOTA	None of the above			
Majority				
Turnout				
gain from		Swing		

=== 2022 ===
2022 Uttar Pradesh Legislative Assembly election: Chunar
Party	Candidate	Votes	%	±%
BJP	Anurag Singh	110,980	50.26	▲1.5
AD(K)	Ramashankar Prasad Singh	63,366	28.7	
BSP	Vijay Kumar	29,389	13.31	▼4.73
INC	Seema Devi	4,164	1.89	
VIP	Amit Kumar Singh	2,782	1.26	
NOTA	None of the above	3,921	1.78	▲0.59
Majority		47,614	21.56	▼7.17
Turnout		220,823	62.33	▼2.22
BJP hold		Swing		

=== 2017 ===
Bharatiya Janta Party candidate Anurag Singh won in 2017 Uttar Pradesh Legislative Elections defeating Samajwadi Party candidate Jagtamba Singh Patel by a margin of 62,228 votes.

2017 Uttar Pradesh Legislative Assembly election: Chunar
Party	Candidate	Votes	%	±%
BJP	Anurag Singh	105,608	48.76	
SP	Jagtamba Singh Patel	43,380	20.03	
BSP	Anmol Singh	39,067	18.04	
Independent	Ramraj Singh Patel	17,009	7.85	
Independent	Sarvesh Kumar Singh	3,898	1.8	
NOTA	None of the above	2,541	1.19	
Majority		62,228	28.73	
Turnout		216,603	64.55	
