= Faquir Ali Ansari =

Indian politician (1938-2003)

MP Faquir Ali Ansari

Members of the 6th Lok Sabha
- In office 1977–1979
- President: B. D. Jatti; Neelam Sanjiva Reddy
- Prime Minister: Morarji Desai
- Constituency: Mirzapur

Personal details
- Born: 14 June 1938 Uttar Pradesh, India
- Died: 18 May 2003 (aged 64)
- Party: Janata Party
- Spouse: Noorishyam Kasimi
- Children: 5

Faquir Ali Ansari (14 June 1938 – 18 May 2003) was an Indian politician, trader and industrialist who served as member of parliament in 6th Lok Sabha. He represented Mirzapur parliamentary constituency in 1977. He was affiliated with Janata Party.

== Biography ==
He was born Abdul Quayyum Ansari on 14 June 1938 in Bhadohi city of Varanasi district. He received his education from the National Inter College, Bhadohi.

Prior to joining Janata Party, he was associated with Bharatiya Lok Dal and Bharatiya Kranti Dal. He served general secretary of Bhartiya Kranti Dal for its district committee at Varanasi unit, and vice president of Bharatiya Lok Dal District Committee. He was also a member of Bhadohi Welfare Academy.
