= Ram Rati Bind =

Indian politician

Ram Rati Bind is an Indian politician who served as Member of 13th Lok Sabha from Mirzapur Lok Sabha constituency. On 26 February 2002, he took oath in Lok Sabha. In 2007 byelections in India, he was defeated by Ramesh Dube. In Lok Sabha, he served as Member of Committee on Human Resource Development and Committee on Petition.
