= John N. Wilson =

Indian politician

Member of Parliament, Lok Sabha
- In office 1952–1962
- Succeeded by: Shyam Dhar Mishra
- Constituency: Mirzapur

Personal details
- Born: 25 December 1895
- Party: Indian National Congress
- Spouse: Mabel Roseline Wilson

John N. Wilson was an Indian politician. He was elected to the Lok Sabha, lower house of the Parliament of India as a member of the Indian National Congress.
