= Maa Kaali & Bhagwan Shankar Temple =

Hindu Temple in Uttar Pradesh, India

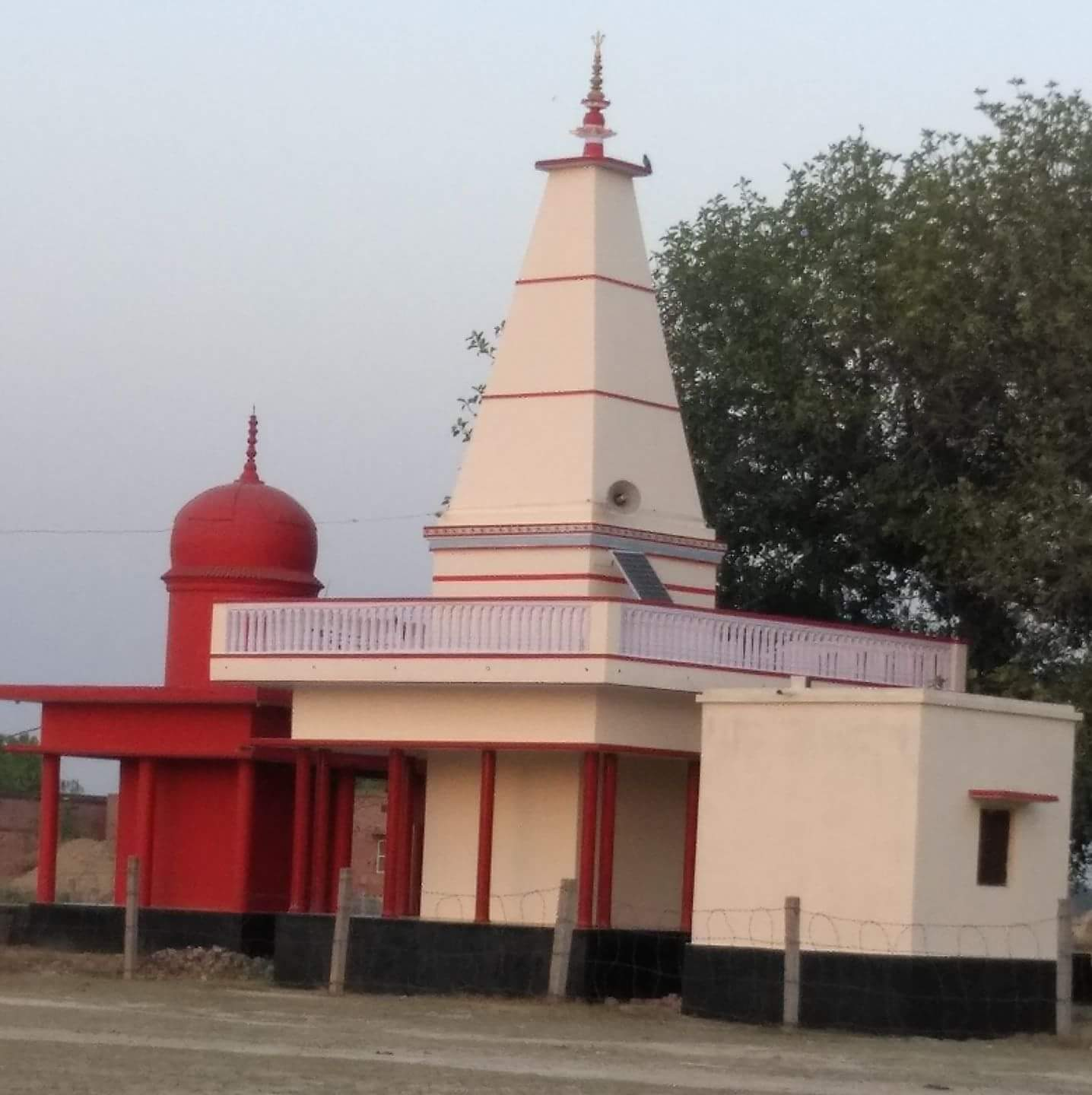
- day view of temple

- Location within Uttar Pradesh Location within India

Religion
- Affiliation: Hinduism
- District: Jaunpur district
- Deity: Shiva and Kali
- Festivals: Kali Puja, Navratri, Maha Shivaratri, Diwali
- Ecclesiastical or organisational status: Temple
- Governing body: Gram Panchayat Bisauri
- Status: Active

Location
- Location: Bisauri
- State: Uttar Pradesh
- Country: India
- Coordinates: 25.59172°N 83.070256°E

Architecture
- Creator: Local villagers

Specifications
- Materials: Bricks, Stones and Marbles
- Elevation: 77 m (253 ft)

Maa Kaali and Bhagwan Shankar Temple is an ancient Hindu temple. It is situated in Bisauri village Jaunpur district, Uttar Pradesh, India.

Maha Shivratri and Navratri are some main festivals celebrated.
