= Rama Shankar Singh =

Indian politician

Minister of State for Energy Government of Uttar Pradesh
- In office 21 August 2019 – 25 March 2022
- Chief Minister: Yogi Adityanath
- Minister: Shrikant Sharma

Member of Uttar Pradesh Legislative Assembly
- Incumbent
- Assumed office 2017
- Preceded by: Laliteshpati Tripathi
- Constituency: Marihan

Personal details
- Born: 15 July 1969 (age 55); Chunar, Mirzapur district, Uttar Pradesh
- Political party: Bharatiya Janata Party
- Spouse: Sita Singh (m. 1989)
- Children: 2 sons
- Parent: Shiv Prasad Singh (father)
- Occupation: Agriculture

Rama Shankar Singh (also known as Rama Shankar Singh Patel) born July 15, 1969, is an Indian politician and a member of 17th Legislative Assembly, Uttar Pradesh of India. He represents the Marihan constituency in Mirzapur district of Uttar Pradesh. He is a member of the Bharatiya Janata Party. In 2006 he was awarded for good work in his village (Idol Village) by the President of India Dr. A P J Abdul Kalam.

== Political career ==
Singh defeated his close contestant Lalitesh Pati Tripathi from Indian National Congress with a margin of 46,598 votes in the Uttar Pradesh Legislative Assembly election held in 2017.

He has been appointed Minister of state of Energy and Additional Energy Sources of Energy in a Yogi Adityanath cabinet on 21 August 2019. Rama was also selected for Adarsh Gram under the Swachh Bharat Mission Grameen by the Government of Uttar Pradesh.

== Posts held ==
| # | From | To | Position | Comments |
|---|---|---|---|---|
| 01 | 1989 | 1990 | Member of the Student Council | |
| 02 | 1990 | 1991 | Vice President of the Students' Union | |
| 03 | 1995 | 2000 | Village Head Golhanpur (Pradhan) | |
| 04 | 2003 | 2006 | District Vice President Bharatiya Janata Party Kisan Morcha | |
| 05 | 2006 | 2009 | District President Kisan Morcha | |
| 06 | 2009 | 2012 | District General Secretary in the Bharatiya Janata Party | |
| 07 | 2016 | 2017 | Member regional working committee (BJP) | |
| 06 | 2017 | Incumbent | Member, 17th Legislative Assembly | |
| 07 | 2019 | Incumbent | Minister of State, Government of Uttar Pradesh | |
