= Anti-Copying Act, 1992 =

Indian subnational government legislation

The Anti-Copying Act, 1992 was an Indian legislation enacted in 1992 by the Government of Uttar Pradesh headed by Kalyan Singh of the Bharatiya Janata Party. Rajnath Singh, though the minister for education in the Singh government during the time, was credited with the idea, it was the brain child of the Chief Minister Kalyan Singh himself. The law aimed to stop practice of mass copying in school and university examinations in the State. The Act made use of unfair means in examinations a cognisable offence, and a non-bailable one, and reportedly allowed the police to enter the examination premises to conduct checks. However, the Samajwadi Party and Bahujan Samaj Party government headed by Mulayam Singh Yadav which came to power in 1993, repealed it the following year.
