= Tiwaripur, Mirzapur =

Village in Uttar Pradesh, India

Tiwaripur is a village in Mirzapur, Uttar Pradesh, India.
