= Kailash Nath Chaurasiya =

Indian politician

Kailash Nath

Member of the Uttar Pradesh Legislative Assembly
- In office 2002–2017
- Constituency: Mirzapur

Personal details
- Party: Samajwadi Party

Kailash Nath Chaurasiya is an Indian politician who was a member of the 2002 Uttar Pradesh Legislative Assembly, the 2007 Uttar Pradesh Legislative Assembly, and the 16th Uttar Pradesh Assembly. He is an assembly member of the Mirzapur Assembly constituency and a member of the Samajwadi Party.
