= Bisauri =

- Village
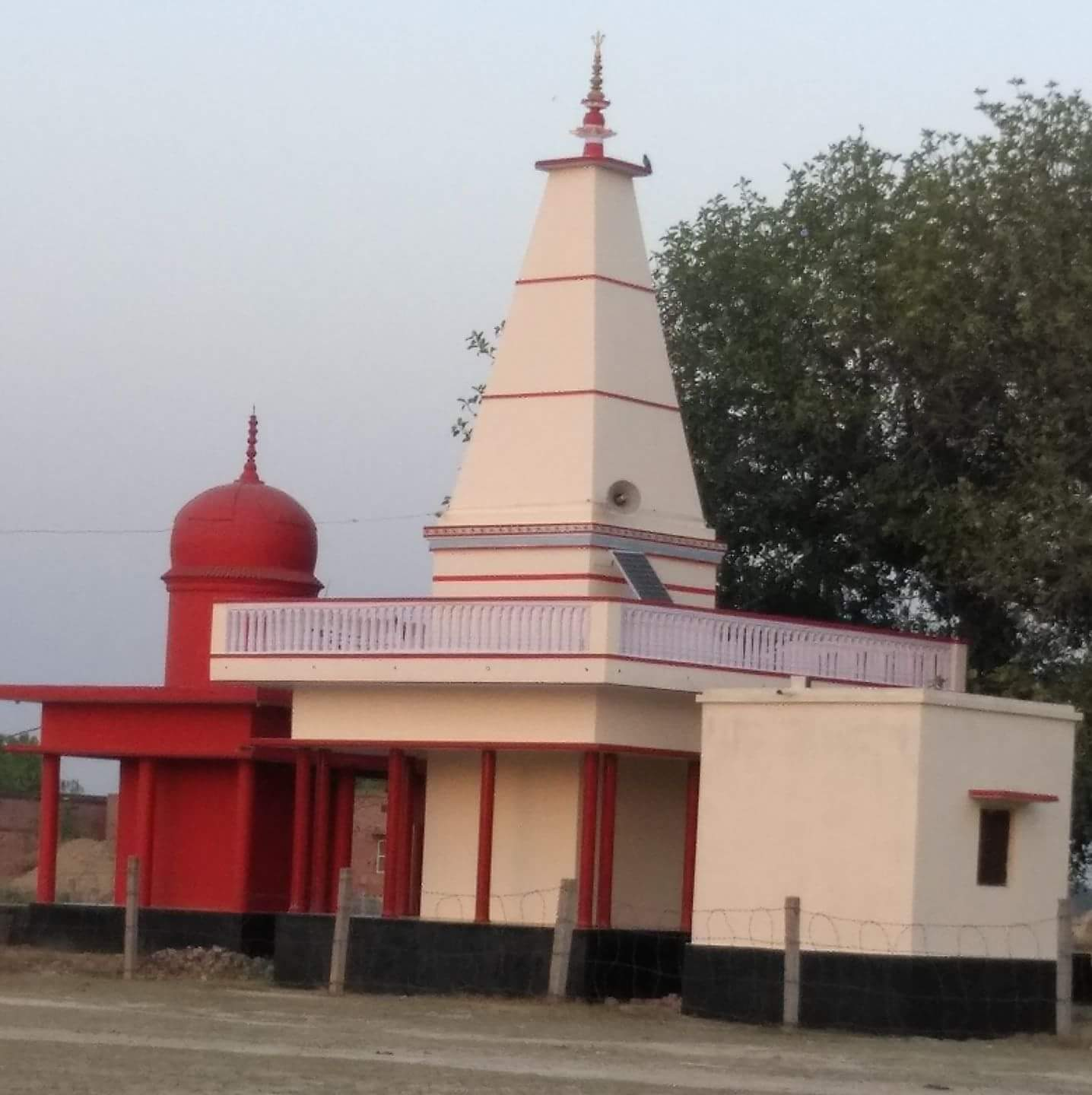
- Goddess Kaali & Lord Shankar temple in village.

- Location in Jaunpur, Uttar Pradesh, India Bisauri (India)
- Coordinates: 25.5895125°N 83.0678362°E
- Country: India
- State: Uttar Pradesh
- District: Jaunpur
- Tehsil: Kerakat
- Block: Dobhi

Government
  - Type: Gram Panchayat/ Vidhan Sabha
  - Body: Gram Pradhan

Area
  - Total: 1.72 km^{2} (0.66 sq mi)
- Elevation /Altitude: 77 m (253 ft)

Population (2011)
  - Total: 939
  - Density: 546/km^{2} (1,410/sq mi)

Demographics

Languages
  - Official: Hindi
  - Other: Bhojpuri (Jaunpuri dialect), English
  - Literacy Rate: 67.21%
- Time zone: UTC+5:30 (IST)
- PIN: 222129
- Vehicle registration: UP-62
- Sex ratio: 452/487 ♂/♀
- Distance from Varanasi: 44 kilometres (27 mi)
- Distance from Jaunpur: 49 kilometres (30 mi)
- Distance from Ghazipur: 55 kilometres (34 mi)
- Distance from Azamgarh: 70 kilometres (43 mi)
- Lok Sabha constituency: Machhlishahr (Lok Sabha constituency)
- Website: http://jaunpur.nic.in/ https://facebook.com/bisauri

Bisauri is a village of the Jaunpur district, Uttar Pradesh, Northern India. Bisauri's Postal Index Number is 222129 and its post office is at Patrahi. The village is also a Gram Panchayat, comprising itself and the village of Tiwaripur.

== Geography ==
The area of Bisauri village is 2 square kilometres (0.77 mi^{2}) and it is the 127th biggest village by area in the sub-district. Kerakat is nearest town, and Varanasi and Jaunpur are the nearest cities.

Bisauri belongs to Varanasi division and Jaunpur district administration. It is located 49 km east of the city of Jaunpur, and 306 km from Lucknow, the capital of Uttar Pradesh.

== Education ==
Primary education is provided in the village by Prathmik Vidyalaya and Uchchatar Madhyamik Vidyalaya. Further education is provided elsewhere.

== Transportation ==
=== Rail ===
Dudhaunda railway station, Dobhi Railway Station and Kerakat railway station are the nearest railway stations. Dobhi is a stop of many trains for big cities such as Mumbai, Delhi and other cities.

=== Road ===
Aside from being connected to Jaunpur, Bisauri is also connected by road to Varanasi, Azamgarh, Ghazipur and other cities of Uttar Pradesh.

=== Air ===
The closest major airport to Bisauri is Lal Bahadur Shastri Airport at Babatpur, Varanasi, 45 km by road. Another nearby airport is Azamgarh Airport.

== Historic places and sights ==
- Maa Kaali & Bhagwan Shankar Temple

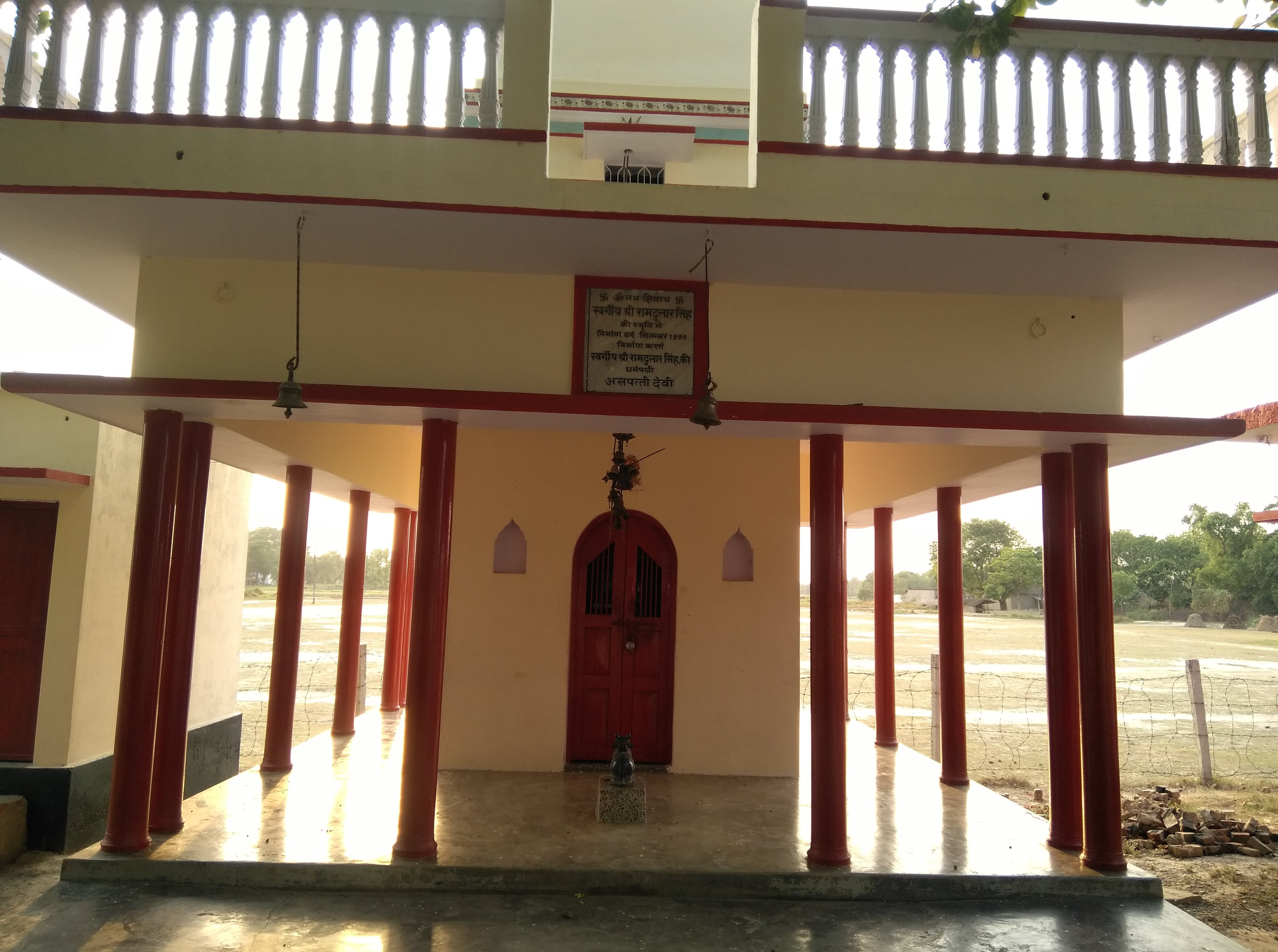
Bhagwan Shankar Temple

== Constituency area ==
The village falls under Machhlishahr constituency for national elections and Kerakat constituency for state elections.

== Nearby villages ==
- Ataharpar
- Bodari
- Chitkon
- Chandpur
- Ghuttha
- Hisampur
- Kopa
- Krishna Nagar
- Marhi
- Patrahi
- Rehari
- Tiwaripur

== Demographics ==
As of the 2011 Census of India, Bisauri village has population of 939 of which 452 (48.13%) are males while 487 (51.86%) are females as per Population Census 2011. 70% of the whole population are from general caste, 30% are from schedule caste. In Bisauri village population of children with age 0-6 is 137 which makes up 14.59% of total population of village, among them 54% are boys and 46% are girls. There are 159 households in the village and an average 6 persons live in every family. Average Sex Ratio of Bisauri village is 1077 which is higher than Uttar Pradesh state average of 912. Child Sex Ratio for the Bisauri as per census is 851, lower than Uttar Pradesh average of 902.

Bisauri village has lower literacy rate in comparison to Uttar Pradesh. In 2011, literacy rate of Bisauri village was 67.21% compared to 67.68% of Uttar Pradesh. In Bisauri Male literacy stands at 80.42% while female literacy rate was 55.42%.
