= Marihan Assembly constituency =

Constituency of the Uttar Pradesh legislative assembly in India

Coordinates: 24.92°N 82.69°E

Marihan
- Constituency No. 399 for the Uttar Pradesh Legislative Assembly

Constituency details
- Country: India
- Region: North India
- State: Uttar Pradesh
- District: Mirzapur
- Total electors: 3,66,489
- Reservation: None

Member of Legislative Assembly
- 18th Uttar Pradesh Legislative Assembly
- Incumbent Rama Shankar Singh
- Party: Bharatiya Janta Party
- Elected year: 2017

Marihan is a constituency of the Uttar Pradesh Legislative Assembly covering the city of Marihan in the Mirzapur district of Uttar Pradesh, India.

Marihan is one of five assembly constituencies in the Mirzapur Lok Sabha constituency. Since 2008, this assembly constituency is numbered 399 amongst 403 constituencies.

== Members of the Legislative Assembly ==
Year	Member	Party
Till 2012 : Constituency did not exist
2012	Lalitesh Pati Tripathi	Indian National Congress
2017	Rama Shankar Singh	Bharatiya Janata Party
2022	Rama Shankar Singh	Bharatiya Janata Party

== Election results ==
=== 2027 ===
2027 Uttar Pradesh Legislative Assembly election: Marihan
Party	Candidate	Votes	%	±%
INDIA				
NDA				
BSP				
NOTA	None of the above			
Majority				
Turnout				
gain from		Swing		

=== 2022 ===
2022 Uttar Pradesh Legislative Assembly election: Marihan
Party	Candidate	Votes	%	±%
BJP	Rama Shankar Singh	105,377	44.51	−0.19
BSP	Narendra Singh Kusawaha	42,466	17.94	−4.21
SP	Ravindra Singh Patel	42,007	17.74	
AD(K)	Awadhesh Kumar Singh	23,982	10.13	
INC	Gita Devi Kol	4,928	2.08	−23.06
Rashtra Uday Party	Bhaiya Lal Pal	4,522	1.91	
RSPS	Ramteerath Pal	2,490	1.05	
NOTA	None of the above	2,177	0.92	−0.19
Majority		62,911	26.57	+7.01
Turnout		236,733	64.59	−4.5
BJP hold		Swing		

=== 2017 ===
Bharatiya Janta Party candidate Rama Shankar Singh won in 2017 Uttar Pradesh Legislative Elections defeating Indian National Congress candidate Lalitesh Pati Tripathi by a margin of 46,598 votes.

2017 Uttar Pradesh Legislative Assembly Election: Mariha
Party	Candidate	Votes	%	±%
BJP	Rama Shankar Singh	106,517	44.7	
INC	Lalitesh Pati Tripathi	59,919	25.14	
BSP	Awadhesh Kumar Singh	52,782	22.15	
Independent	Siddharth Shekhar Bauddh	2,787	1.17	
Independent	Rajendra Prasad	2,421	1.02	
NISHAD	Kaushilya	2,252	0.95	
NOTA	None of the above	2,614	1.11	
Majority		46,598	19.56	
Turnout		238,300	69.09	
