= National Working Committee of All India Trinamool Congress =

Executive committee of National Working Committee of All India Trinamool Congress

The National Working Committee of All India Trinamool Congress is the executive committee of Trinamool Congress. It was formed in December 1998 at Kolkata and was headed by Ajit Kumar Panja. It is composed of senior party leaders and is responsible for taking decisions on important policy and organizational matters, as well as guiding and directing the party's activities and campaigns at the national level. The Working Committee is currently headed by the party Chairperson Mamata Banerjee.

== Composition of National Working Committee ==
=== President ===
Name	Portrait	Position in government
Mamata Banerjee		Chairperson; Former Chief Minister of West Bengal

=== Members ===
S. No	Member	Portrait	Position in government
1.	Abhishek Banerjee		National General Secretary; Leader of Trinamool Congress , Lok Sabha; Member of Parliament
2.	Subrata Bakshi		National Vice President of All India Trinamool Congress; Former Member of Parliament; Former National General Secretary; Former President of West Bengal Pradesh Trinamool Congress
3.	Derek O'Brien		National Secretary; Member of Parliament; Leader of Trinamool Congress,Rajya Sabha; National Spokesperson
4.	Dola Sen		National Secretary; Member of Parliament
5.	Subhasish Chakraborty		Treasurer; Former Member of Parliament; President of All India Trinamool Congress , South 24 Pargana Organisational District
6.	Sovandeb Chattopadhyay		Floor Leader of All India Trinamool Congress in West Bengal Legislative Assembly; Member of West Bengal Legislative Assembly; Former Cabinet Minister,Government of West Bengal
7.	Amit Mitra		Former Cabinet Minister,Government of West Bengal
8.	Mukul Sangma		Leader of the Opposition Meghalaya Legislative Assembly; Former Chief Minister of Meghalaya; Former Deputy Chief Minister of Meghalaya; Member of the Meghalaya Legislative Assembly
9.	Moloy Ghatak		President of West Bengal Pradesh Indian National Trinamool Trade Union Congress; Former Cabinet Minister, Government of West Bengal
10.	Saugata Roy		Member of Parliament; Former Union Minister of State; Former Member of West Bengal Legislative Assembly
11.	Biman Banerjee		Former Speaker of the West Bengal Legislative Assembly; President of West Bengal Pradesh Trinamool Legal Cell
12.	Lalitesh Pati Tripathi		Former Member of Uttar Pradesh Legislative Assembly
13.	Kalyan Banerjee		Member of Parliament; National Spokesperson
14.	Mahua Moitra		Member of Parliament; President of All India Trinamool Congress , Krishnanagar Organisational District
15.	Birbaha Hansda		President of All India Trinamool Congress ST Cell; Former Cabinet Minister, Government of West Bengal
16.	Madan Mitra		Member of West Bengal Legislative Assembly; Former Cabinet Minister, Government of West Bengal; General Secretary of West Bengal Pradesh All India Trinamool Congress; President of All India Trinamool Congress , Dumdum Organisational District; Former President of Trinamool Youth Congress
17.	Nadimul Haque		Member of Parliament
18.	Ashima Patra		Member of West Bengal Legislative Assembly; Former Cabinet Minister, Government of West Bengal
19.	Bulu Chik Baraik		Former Cabinet Minister, Government of West Bengal
20.	Goutam Deb		Former Mayor of Siliguri; Former Cabinet Minister, Government of West Bengal; Executive Member of West Bengal Pradesh Trinamool Congress; Chairman of All India Trinamool Congress , Darjeeling Organisational District
21.	Kunal Ghosh		Member of West Bengal Legislative Assembly; Former Member of Parliament, Rajya Sabha; General Secretary of West Bengal Pradesh All India Trinamool Congress; President of All India Trinamool Congress , North Kolkata Organisational District
22.	Baiswanor Chattopadhyay		President of All India Trinamool Congress , South Kolkata Organisational District; Former State Secretary of All India Trinamool Congress , West Bengal Pradesh; Former President of Trinamool Congress Chhatra Parishad

== See also ==
- Ma Mati Manush
- I.N.D.I.A.
