= Anurag Singh (politician) =

Indian politician

Member of the Uttar Pradesh Legislative Assembly
- Incumbent
- Assumed office March 2022
- Constituency: Chunar

Member of the Uttar Pradesh Legislative Assembly
- In office March 2017 – 2022
- Constituency: Chunar

Personal details
- Born: 24 July 1971 (age 54) Varanasi, Uttar Pradesh, India
- Party: Bharatiya Janata Party
- Profession: Politician

Anurag Singh (born 24 April 1971) is an Indian politician and a member of Legislative Assembly, Uttar Pradesh of India. He represented the Chunar constituency in Mirzapur district of Uttar Pradesh. Anurag Singh is Bhartiya Janta Party MLA from Chunar assembly of district Mirzapur for the second consecutive time. He is the son of Om Prakash Singh, ex BJP Uttar Pradesh State President and senior minister in UP Government.

== Early life and education ==
Singh was born in a patel family of Mirzapur district of Uttar Pradesh. Anurag completed his primary education in Varanasi. He pursued B.A. from DAV Varanasi. Later, he did his MBA from Bundelkhand University.

== Political career ==
Anurag Singh belongs to a political family of Uttar Pradesh. His father, Om Prakash Singh had been cabinet minister in Kalyan Singh government as well as State President of Uttar Pradesh BJP.

Anurag Singh contested Uttar Pradesh Assembly Election as Bharatiya Janata Party candidate and defeated Samajwadi Party candidate Jagtamba Singh Patel by a margin of 62,228 votes.After that, again in the year 2022, Anurag Singh won a big victory by defeating Apna Dal Kamerawadi and Samajwadi Party's alliance candidate Ramashankar Prasad Singh by 47614 votes.

He joined Rashtriya Swayamsevak Sangh (RSS) in the year 1989 as Swayam Sewak. He became "Mukhya Shikshak" in the RSS in 1990 and later, he joined ABVP and became vice president of DAV unit. In the year 2008, he became member of State Working Committee of Bhartiya Janta Yuva Morcha.

He contested parliamentary election from Mirzapur in 2009 from BJP, but could not win. In the year 2010, he became member of BJP state working committee of Uttar Pradesh.

== Political movements ==
It is believed that Anurag Singh painted several walls of Varanasi during Ram Janmbhoomi Andolan in 1990, for which he got arrested.

== Posts held ==
#	From	To	Position	Assembly	Comments
01	2017	2022	Member of Legislative Assembly	Chunar	
01	2022	Present	Member of Legislative Assembly	Chunar	

== See also ==
- Uttar Pradesh Legislative Assembly
- Chunar (Assembly constituency)
- Mirzapur
- Bhartiya Janta Party
