= Mirzapur Clock Tower =

Clock tower in India

Coordinates: 25.1503°N 82.5703°E

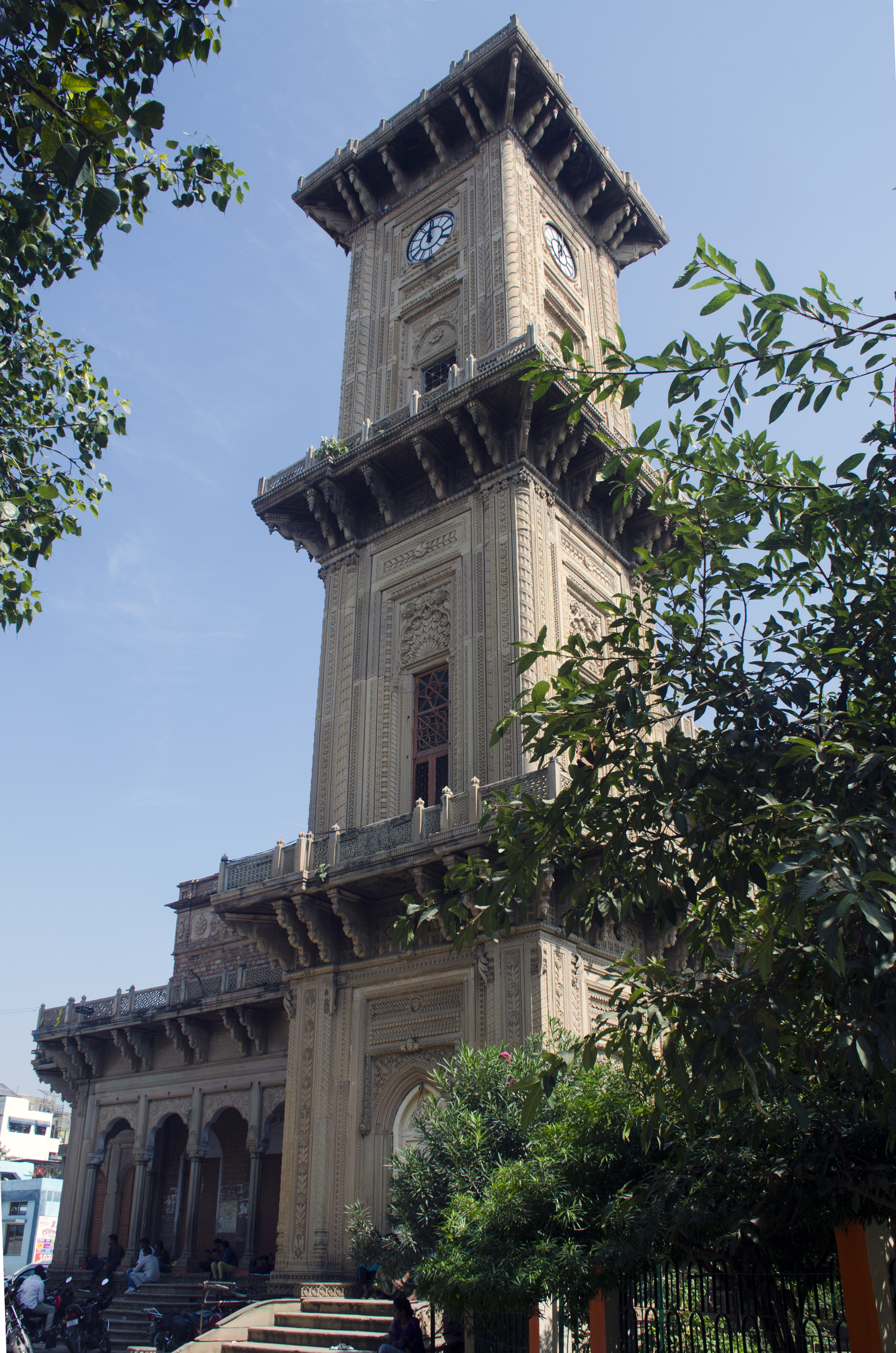
Mirzapur Clock Tower

Mirzapur Clock Tower is a heritage architecture situated at Mirzapur, in the Indian state of Uttar Pradesh. It is adorned with fine carvings, clock with 1000 kg alloy metal bell and 20 feet long pendulum hangs on top of the tower. The clock was made in London by M/s Mears Stan Bank Company in 1866. The tower was made in 1891.

== Importance ==
The Indian Standard Time is calculated from the 82.5 degrees East longitude, which falls in this clock tower in Mirzapur. The clock tower is popularly known as Mirzapur Ghanta Ghar.
