= Om Prakash Singh =

Indian politician

Minister of Irrigation Government of Uttar Pradesh
- In office 27 March 1997 – 8 March 2002
- Chief Minister: Mayawati; Kalyan Singh; Ram Prakash Gupta; Rajnath Singh
- In office 24 June 1991 – 6 December 1992
- Chief Minister: Kalyan Singh

President of Bharatiya Janata Party, Uttar Pradesh
- In office 3 January 2000 – 17 August 2000
- Preceded by: Rajnath Singh
- Succeeded by: Kalraj Mishra

Member of Uttar Pradesh Legislative Council
- In office May 1990 – 8 December 1993

Member of Uttar Pradesh Legislative Assembly
- In office 1993–2012
- Preceded by: Yadunath Singh
- Succeeded by: Jagatamba Singh
- Constituency: Chunar
- In office 1974–1980
- Preceded by: Shiva Das
- Succeeded by: Yadunath Singh
- Constituency: Chunar

Personal details
- Born: 6 February 1946 (age 80) Magraha, United Provinces, British India
- Party: Bharatiya Janata Party
- Other political affiliations: Bharatiya Jan Sangh (till 1977)
- Spouse: Saroj Singh (m. 1969)
- Children: Anurag Singh (son)
- Parent: Vimla Sharan Singh (father)
- Education: LLM

Om Prakash Singh (born 6 February 1946) is a politician associated with the Bharatiya Janata Party since its inception. He served as Irrigation minister on two occasions, 1991–92 and 1997-2002. He has also served as the President of the Uttar Pradesh unit of the Bharatiya Janata Party in 2000, and served as the floor leader of the BJP in Uttar Pradesh Legislative Assembly from 2007-12.
