= Tiwaripur, Jaunpur =

Tiwaripur
- Village
- Location in Jaunpur, Uttar Pradesh, India Tiwaripur (India)
- Coordinates: 25.588397°N 83.056273°E
- Country: India
- State: Uttar Pradesh
- District: Jaunpur
- Tehsil: Kerakat
- Block: Dobhi
- Gram Panchayat: Bisauri

Government
  - Type: Gram Panchayat/ Vidhan Sabha
  - Body: Gram Pradhan

Area
  - Total: 0.44 km^{2} (0.17 sq mi)
- Elevation: 77 m (253 ft)

Population (2011)
  - Total: 529
  - Density: 1,200/km^{2} (3,100/sq mi)

Languages
  - Official: Hindi
  - Other: Bhojpuri (Jaunpuri dialect), English
  - Literacy Rate: 69.1%
- Time zone: UTC+5:30 (IST)
- PIN: 222129
- Vehicle registration: UP-62
- Sex ratio: 236/293 ♂/♀
- Distance from Varanasi: 41 kilometres (25 mi)
- Distance from Jaunpur: 47 kilometres (29 mi)
- Distance from Ghazipur: 57 kilometres (35 mi)
- Distance from Azamgarh: 71 kilometres (44 mi)
- Lok Sabha constituency: Machhlishahr (Lok Sabha constituency)
- Website: http://jaunpur.nic.in/

Tiwaripur is situated in Kerakat tehsil, Jaunpur district, Uttar Pradesh, India. It is one of 425 villages in the tehsil and forms a part of Bisauri gram panchayat.
