= Ratnakar Mishra =

Indian politician

MLA, 17th Legislative Assembly
- Incumbent
- Assumed office 2017
- Preceded by: Kailash Chaurasia
- Constituency: Mirzapur Sadar, Mirzapur district

Personal details
- Born: 15 November 1963 (age 62) Vindhyachal
- Party: Bharatiya Janata Party
- Occupation: MLA
- Profession: Politician

Ratnakar Mishra is an Indian politician and a member of 17th Legislative Assembly, Uttar Pradesh of India. He represents the Mirzapur Sadar constituency of Uttar Pradesh. He is a member of the Bharatiya Janata Party. He has been a member of Uttar Pradesh Bharatiya Janata Party (BJP) executive committee for last ten years.

== Early life ==
Apart from being a political activist he has been one of main teerth Purohits (pilgrim priest) at renowned Vindhyavasini Temple at Vindhyachal, Mirzapur. He has performed religious ceremony for all top leadership of Bharatiya Janata Party, from Lal Krishna Advani to Amit Shah. It was reported in daily newspapers that he performed special puja to ensure the victory of Prime Minister Narendra Modi in Lok Sabha elections held in 2014. He was even a special invitee at Prime Minister Narendra Modi's swearing in Ceremony.

== Political career ==
Mishra emerged victorious from Mirzapur Sadar seat in Uttar Pradesh assembly elections held in 2017 defeating his close contestant Kailash Chaurasiya with a margin of 57,412 votes.

Ratnakar Mishra won again in Uttar Pradesh assembly elections 2022 with 118642 votes.

== Posts held ==
#	From	To	Position	Comments
01	2017	Incumbent	Member, 17th Legislative Assembly	
