= Ramesh Dube =

Indian politician

- Constituency: Mirzapur

Personal details
- Born: 16 October 1942 (age 83) Manikpur, Bhadohi, Uttar Pradesh
- Party: BSPIndian National Congress
- Spouse: Late KUSUM DUBE
- Children: 2 sons
- As of 22 September, 2006 Source: ["Official biography". Parliament of India records. Archived from the original on 15 June 2006.]

Ramesh Dube (born 16 October 1942) is an Indian politician with the Bahujan Samaj Party (BSP). He stood for the 2007 by-elections on the BSP ticket and was a Member of Parliament from Mirzapur.

He is a former Member of the Legislative Assembly during 1985-1995 from Indian National Congress and state minister from Andheri

Earlier he was member of Mumbai Municipal Corporation during 1968–1984. He was also founder member of Nationalist Congress Party
