= Mirzapur =

City in Uttar Pradesh, India

- City
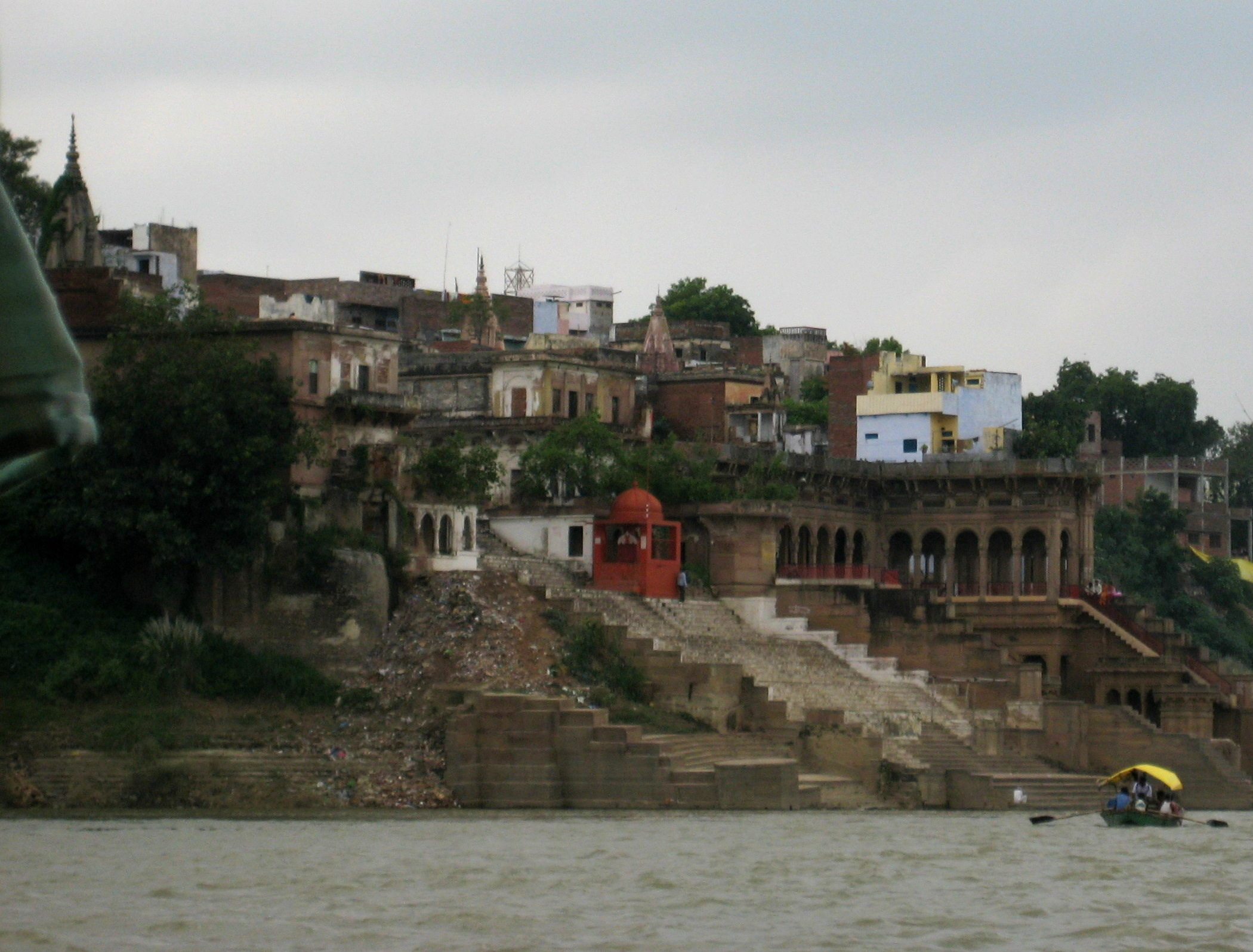
- Temples around Bariya Ghat

- Location within Uttar Pradesh Location within India
- Coordinates: 25.146°N 82.569°E
- Country: India
- State: Uttar Pradesh
- District: Mirzapur
- Established: 1735
- Named for: City of the Mirza (child of the ruler in Persian)

Government
  - Type: Municipality
  - Divisional Commissioner: Shri Rajesh Prakash (IAS)
  - District Magistrate: Shri Pawan Kumar Gangwar (IAS)
  - Member of Lok Sabha: Anupriya Patel (Apna Dal)

Area
  - City: 40 km^{2} (15 sq mi)
  - Rank: 13th in Uttar Pradesh
- Elevation: 80 m (260 ft)

Population (2011)
  - City: 233,691
  - Rank: 25th in Uttar Pradesh
  - Density: 6,069/km^{2} (15,720/sq mi)
  - Metro: 245,817
- Demonym: Mirzapuri

Language
  - Official: Hindi
  - Additional official: Urdu
- Time zone: UTC+5:30 (IST)
- PIN: 231001
- Telephone code: 05442
- Vehicle registration: UP-63
- Sex ratio: 0.903 (2011)
- Literacy: 68.48% (2011) (78.97%♂; 56.86%♀)
- Website: mirzapur.nic.in

Mirzapur (pronounced [mɪ̯r.zɐ.pʊɾ]) is a city in Uttar Pradesh, India. It is known for its carpets and brassware industries, and the tradition of kajari and birha music. Straddled by the Kaimur extension of Vindhya mountains, it served as the headquarters of the Mirzapur district. In the district, Vindhya mountains meet with Indo-Gangetic Plain.

== History ==
Mirzapur is significant in prehistoric art history for its painted rock shelters.

== Geography ==
Mirzapur is located at 25.15°N 82.58°E. It has an average elevation of 80 metres (265 feet). Mirzapur lies between the parallels of 23.52 & 25.32 North latitude and 82.7 and 83.33 East longitude. It forms a portion of the Varanasi district. On the north and north-east it is bounded by Varanasi district, on the south by Sonbhadra district and on the north-west by Prayagraj district.

Indian Standard Time is calculated on the basis of 82.5° E longitude, from the Mirzapur Clock Tower.

== Demographics ==
As of the 2011 census, Mirzapur municipality had a population of 233,691 and the urban agglomeration had a population of 245,817. The municipality had a sex ratio of 869 females per 1,000 males and 11.9% of the population were under six years old. Effective literacy was 78.25%; male literacy was 83.85% and female literacy was 71.80%.

Religions in Mirzapur
Religion	Percent
Hindu	84%
Muslim	15%
Jain	0.4%
Others†	0.6%
Distribution of religions †Includes Sikhs (0.2%), Buddhists (<0.2%).

== Indian Standard Time calculation ==
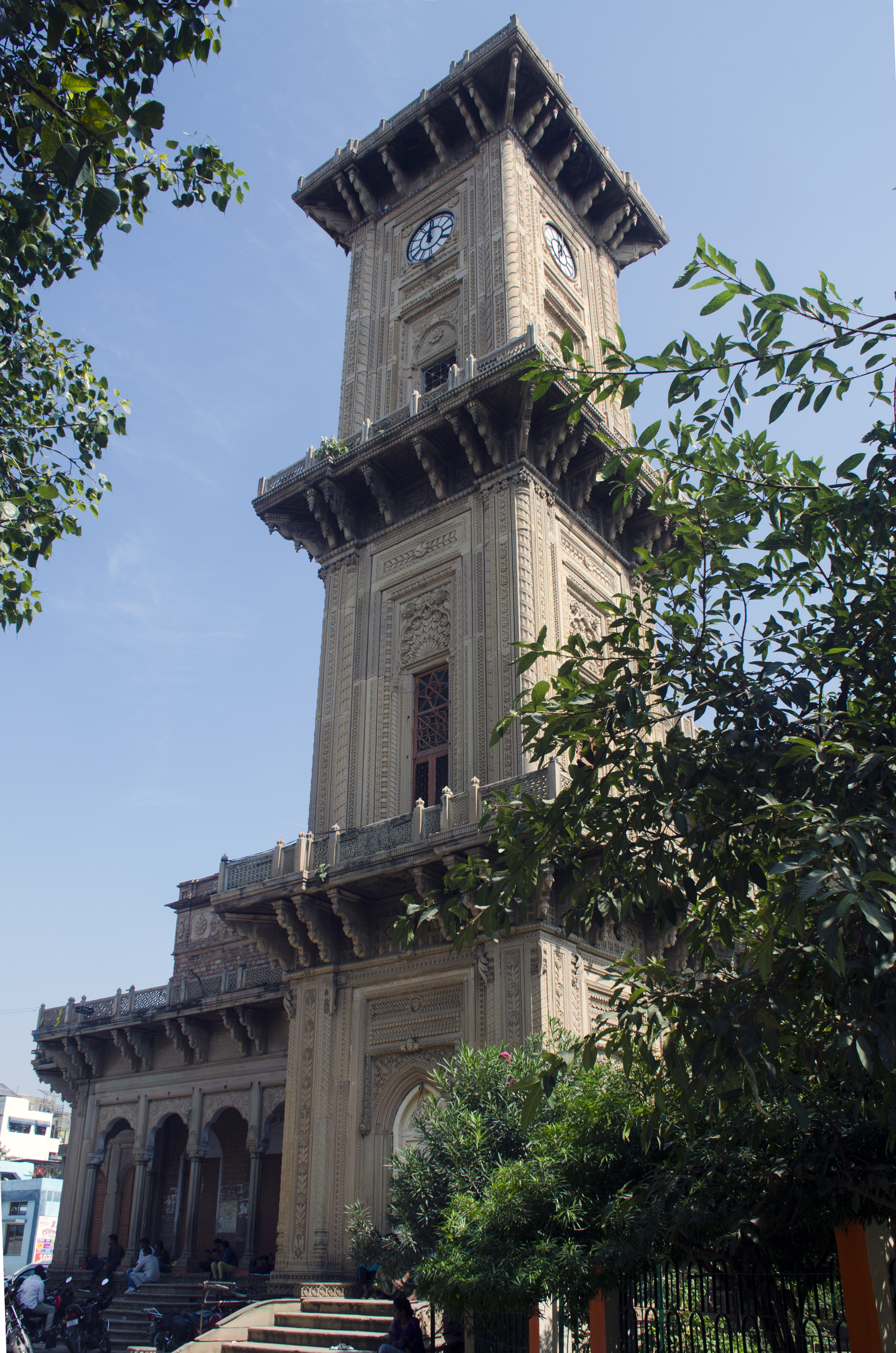
Ghanta Ghar

Indian Standard Time is calculated from the clock tower in Mirzapur nearly exactly on the reference longitude of Indian Standard Time at 82°30'E, within 4 angular minutes, a property shared by Tuni, a town in Andhra Pradesh.

== In popular culture ==
The Indian web series Mirzapur takes place in the city and is also inspired by and references its carpet-making industry.

== See also ==
- Amoi
