= Vindhyachal division =

Administrative division of Uttar Pradesh, India

Coordinates: 25.1507°N 82.5648°E

Vindhyachal division

Vindhyachal division, also sometimes known as Mirzapur division, is one of the 18 administrative geographical units (i.e. division) of the northern Indian state of Uttar Pradesh. Mirzapur city is the administrative headquarters. As of 2018, the division consists of 3 districts:-

- Bhadohi
- Mirzapur
- Sonbhadra

== Industries ==
- Carpets of Bhadohi – The Bhadohi district is biggest carpet manufacturing centres in India, most known for its hand-knotted carpet. Bhadohi known as also carpet city, Mirzapur
- Carpets of Mirzapur and Bhadohi – The largest carpet manufacturing region in Asia, Sonbhadra
- Churk Cement Factory – 800 tonnes per day
- Rihand Dam, Sonbhadra Pipri – 300 MW of electricity, Reservoir for Power Plants
- Hindalco Aluminium Plant, Renukoot – Alumina refining - 114,5000 TPA, Aluminium metal - 424,000 TPA
- Kanoria Chemicals, Renukoot – Acetaldehyde - 10000 TPA, Formaldehyde - 75000 TPA, Lindane - 875 TPA, Hexamine - 4000 TPA, Industrial Alcohol - 225 million litres/annum, Aluminium Chloride - 6875 TPA, Ethyl Acetate - 3300 TPA, Acetic Acid - 6000 TPA, Commercial Hydrogen
- Renusagar Power Plant (Hindalco) – 887.2 MW of electricity
- Obra Dam – 99 MW of electricity, reservoir for power plant
- Dala Cement Factory – 3600 tonnes per day
- Obra Thermal Power Plant, Uttar Pradesh State Electricity Board (UPSEB) – 1550 MW of electricity
- Chunar Cement Factory – Ancillary unit of Dala Cement Factory
- Anpara Thermal Power Plant, UPSEB – 1630 MW of electricity
- B.P. Construction Company, Anpara, Sonbhadra
- Singrauli Thermal Power Plant, NTPC Limited (NTPC), Shaktinagar – 2000 MW of electricity
- Hi -Tech Carbon, Renukoot, Carbon Black – 160,000 million tonnes per year
- Rihand Thermal Power Plant, NTPC, Bijpur – 3000 MW of electricity
- Finding of Gold Mine in Hills, Mirchadhuri
- Kanoria Chemicals Power Plant, Renukoot – 50 MW of electricity
- Obra Thermal Power Plant, UPSEB – 1550 MW of electricity

== Towns in Mirzapur Mandal ==
- Mirzapur, Mirzapur
- chunar, mirzapur
- Vindhyachal, Mirzapur
- Bhadohi, Bhadohi
- Suriyawan, Bhadohi
- Gyanpur, Bhadohi
- Gopiganj, Bhadohi
- khamariya, Bhadohi
- Renukoot, Sonbhadra
- Robertsganj, Sonbhadra
- Obra, Sonbhadra
- Shaktinagar, Sonbhadra
- Chopan, Sonbhadra
- Dudhi, Sonebhadra

== Major rivers ==
- Ganges
- Sone River
- Rihand River

== Hills and waterfalls ==
- Vindhya Range Hills
- Matiranga hills
- Windham Water Fall
- Mukkha Fall

== Popular religious places ==
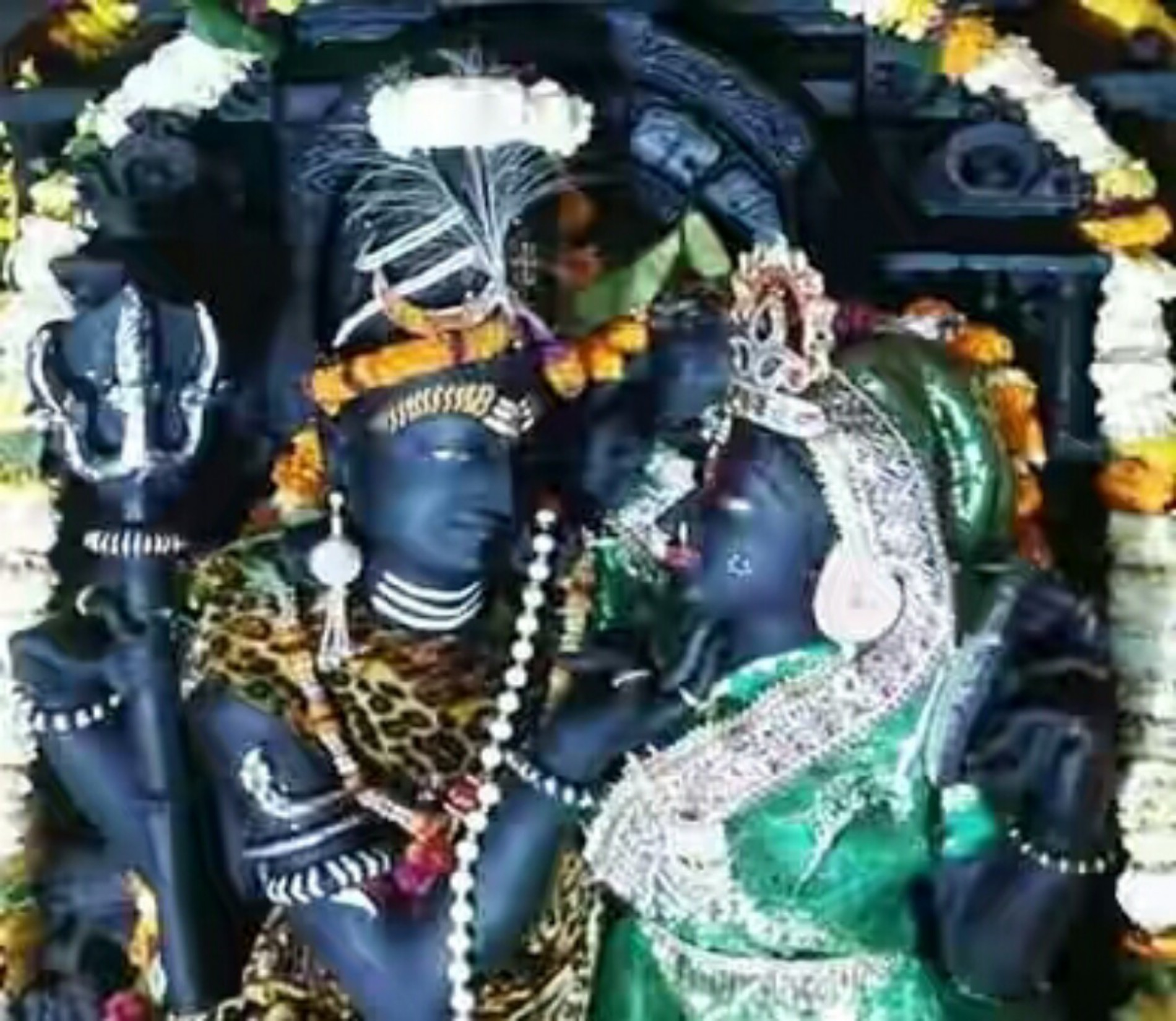
Shivdwar Temple

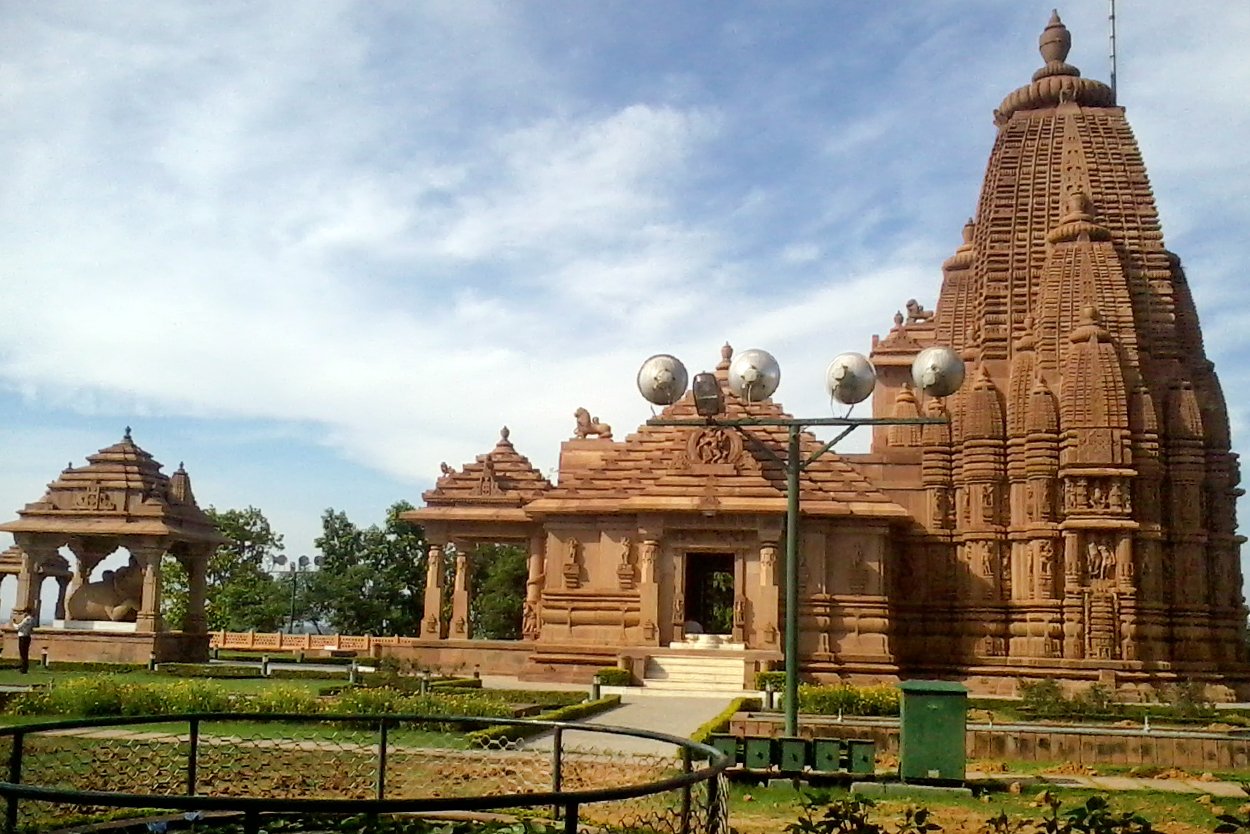
Renukeshwar Mahadev Temple

- Shivdwar, Sonbhadra
- Renukeshwar Mahadev Temple, Sonbhadra
- Vandevi Temple, Renukut
- Jwaladevi Temple, Shaktinagar
- Kantit shareef, Mirzapur
- Vindhyavasini Temple, Vindhyachal, Mirzapur
- Ashtabhuja Mandir, Vindhyachal, Mirzapur
- Kali Khoh Temple, Vindhyachal, Mirzapur
- Sita Samahit Sthal, Sitamarhi, Bhadohi
- Vaishno devi shaktipith, Dala, Sonbhadra

== Historical places ==
- Vijaygarh Fort, Sonbhadra
- Agori Fort, Sonbhadra
- Chunar Fort, Chunar
- Sodharigarh Durg, Sonbhadra

== Major roads and railway junctions ==
- NH2
- Mirzapur Railway Station
- Gyanpur Railway Station
- Bhadohi railway station
- Sonbhadra railway station
- Chopan, Railway Station
- Renukoot, Railway Station
- Shaktinagar, Railway Station
- Chunar, Railway Station
- Anpara Railway station

etc.

Mishri Lal Inter College, Mawaiya, Mirzapur

- Indian Institute of Carpet Technology, Bhadohi.
- Kashi Naresh Government Post Graduate College, Bhadohi
- Kn Government Post Graduate College, Bhadohi
- Rajkeeya Mahavidyalaya, Bhadohi
- Ram Dev Degree College, Bhadohi
- Smt Kanti Singh Law College, Bhadohi
- Falahe Ummat Girls Degree College, Bhadohi
- Ghanshyam Binani Academy of Management Sciences, Mirzapur
- SHALIGRAM COLLEGE OF ENGG. & TECHNOLOGY Mirzapur
- K.B.P.G College, Mirzapur
- G D Binni P G College, Mirzapur
- K.M College, Mirzapur
- Ramkhelwan Singh Mahavidyalaya, Mirzapur
- Ram Lalit Singh Mahavidyalaya, Mirzapur
- Raj Deep Mahila Mahavidyalaya, Mirzapur
- Krishak Mahavidyalaya, Mirzapur
- Kanhiya Lal Basant Lal PG College, Mirzapur
- Kn Government Post Graduate College, Bhadohi
- Rajkeeya Mahavidyalaya, Bhadohi
- Ram Dev Degree College, Bhadohi
- Smt Kanti Singh Law College, Bhadohi
- Mathura College of Law, Mirzapur
- Pushpa Singh Vidhi Mahavidyalaya, Mirzapur
- Babu Ram Singh Mahavidyalaya, Sonbhadra
- Government Post Graduate College, Sonbhadra
- Sant Keenaram Post Graduate College, Sonbhadra
- Sant Keenaram PG College, Sonbhadra
- Govt. Degree College Chunar Mirzapur
- JJIC, Bhurakura, Chunar Mirzapur
- Kailash Nath Institute of Engineering & Technology, Mirzapur
- Jokhulal Piyaridevi Mahavidyalay, Newadhiya, Bhatewara, Mirzapur
