= Konia Kshetra =

Konia Kshetra Konia Kshetra
- region
- Location in Uttar Pradesh, India Konia Kshetra (India)
- Coordinates: 25°14′1″N 82°14′35″E
- Country: India
- State: Uttar Pradesh
- District: Bhadohi

Languages
  - Official: Hindi
- Time zone: UTC+5:30 (IST)
- PIN: 221309
- Telephone code: 05414
- Vehicle registration: UP-66

Konia Kshetra is a region of Bhadohi district, Uttar Pradesh, India. The Ganges River flows through its west end and changes its direction at Checuwan - Bhurra village, where the river's turbulence is reduced. The region is surrounded on three sides by rivers and is located about 35 km (22 miles) from Bhadohi's district headquarters. The region has 17 villages with small, rural populations.

== Villages ==
- Deeghuparwar
- Dhantulasi Uparwar
- Duguna Uparwar
- Khurd
- Shanti
