= Bahupura Uparwar =

Bahupura Uparwar Bahupura
- Village
- Location in Uttar Pradesh, India Bahupura Uparwar (India)
- Coordinates: 25°12′20″N 82°12′51″E
- Country: India
- State: Uttar Pradesh
- District: Bhadohi

Government
  - Body: Gram panchayat
  - Pradhan: Kanchan Devi

Population (2001)
  - Total: 1,013

Languages
  - Official: Hindi
- Time zone: UTC+5:30 (IST)
- PIN: 221309
- Telephone code: 05414
- Vehicle registration: UP-66
- Sex ratio: 53:47 ♂/♀
- Website: up.gov.in

Bahupura Uparwar is a village in Deegh Mandal, Bhadohi district, Uttar Pradesh State. Bahupura Uparwar is located 39.7 km distance from its District Main City Bhadohi. It is located 222 km distance from its State Main City Lucknow.

== Demographics ==
As of 2001 India census, Sherpur had a population of 1013. Males constitute 53% (541) of the population and females 47% (472).
