= Kholua =

Khulua
- Village
- Kholua
- Interactive map of Khulua
- Coordinates: 25.2249°N 82.49191°E
- Country: India
- State: Uttar Pradesh
- District: Mirzapur

Government
  - Type: Sarpanch-Panchayat
  - Body: Kholua Panchayat
  - Mr: Dhirendra Singh

Area
  - Total: 0.91 km^{2} (0.35 sq mi)
- Elevation: 80 m (260 ft)

Population (2011)
  - Total: 2,564
  - Density: 2,800/km^{2} (7,300/sq mi)

Languages
  - Official: Hindi
- Time zone: UTC+5:30 (IST)
- PIN: 231312
- Telephone code: 5442
- Vehicle registration: UP-63
- Website: https://mirzapur.nic.in

Kholua is a village located in the center of India. It is in the Mirzapur, Uttar Pradesh. Kholua has a population of around 2564, and is located on the bank of the Ganges. Kholua is the combined name of five different villages, the others being Semra, Daurhara, Majhalipatti, and Annirudhapur. The capital of the village is Mirzapur. It has been calculated that the clock tower in Mirzapur is nearly exactly on the reference longitude of Indian Standard Time at 82.5°

== Geography ==
Kholua is located at 25.15°N 82.58°E, and has an average elevation of 80 meters (265 feet). The village is surrounded by the Ganges to the south, Majhlipatti and Dhabiya to the west, Daurahra to the east, and Hanumananagar to the north.

== Commerce ==
Agriculture is the primary industry of the village, but some villagers also work in both government and private sectors. Carpet manufacturing is the second largest industry and villagers usually go to Khamaria to do their carpet work. Villagers have their own fields so they do not need to buy wheat, rice, potatoes, and other edible crops. There is a small forest is situated south of the village, which is used as a major seasonal source of income for many villagers. For example, the thorny shrubs of the forest are supplied to brick kilns nearby, and forest fire is used to convert the shrubs into sellable fuels.

== Residence ==
Kholua is a traditional Indian village that observes the caste system.

== Vindhyachal ==
A few miles away from Kholua is a site of pilgrimage to Hindus known as Vindhyachal, where according legends, a part of Sati (an avatar of Durga) fell. Other sites of pilgrimage include Kali Khoh (literally "the cave of the Goddess Kali") where a statue of the Kali has a mouth formed in the shape of a cave.
