= Sherpur Uparwar =

Sherpur Uparwar Sherpur
- Village
- Location in Uttar Pradesh, India Sherpur Uparwar (India) Sherpur Uparwar (India)
- Coordinates: 25°12′4″N 82°13′16″E
- Country: India
- State: Uttar Pradesh
- District: Bhadohi

Government
  - Body: Gram panchayat

Population (2001)
  - Total: 296

Languages
  - Official: Hindi
- Time zone: UTC+5:30 (IST)
- PIN: 221309
- Telephone code: 05414
- Vehicle registration: UP-66
- Sex ratio: 49:51 ♂/♀
- Website: up.gov.in

Sherpur Uparwar is a small village in Deegh Mandal in Bhadohi district in Uttar Pradesh State.

== Demographics ==
As of 2001 India census, Sherpur had a population of 296. Males constitute 49%(145)of the population and females 51%(151).
