= Anegpur =

- Village
- Location in Uttar Pradesh, India Anegpur (India)
- Coordinates: 25.388°N 82.641°E
- Country: India
- State: Uttar Pradesh
- District: Bhadohi district

Languages
  - Official: Hindi
- Time zone: UTC+5:30 (IST)
- PIN: 221402
- Telephone code: 05414
- Nearest city: Bhadohi
- Climate: sub-tropical humid

Anegpur is a village of Bhadohi district (formerly known as Sant Ravidas Nagar district) in the state of Uttar Pradesh in northern India. It comes under Bhadohi Lok Sabha constituency. Anegpur is a carpet manufacturing village in Bhadohi. It is known for its hand-knotted carpet and Indo Gabbeh.

== Geography ==
This village is situated in the plains of the Ganges River. Varuna and Morva are the main rivers. The Village is bounded by river Morva in the west and the river Varuna in the North. Varuna separates Anegpur from Jaunpur district. There are some small temples in Anegpur that are Shiv temple, Chaura mata mandir and Brahm Baba.

== Overview ==
Anegpur belongs to Mirzapur Division. The distance from Anegpur to Bhadohi block is approximately 8 km and, 20 km towards from District headquarters Gyanpur and 267 km from State capital Lucknow. Anegpur is approximately 40 km from Varanasi. Nearest railway station is Parsipur 3 km and Nearest market is Chauri Bazar about 1.5 km away.

== Economy ==
The soil is mostly alluvial. The irrigation in the district takes place through Tubwells, Pumping Sets, River system. There are two Tubwells in Anegpur village. About 70% of the village area is under cultivation. The economy of the village mainly depends on agriculture and carpet manufacturing.

== Schools ==
Primary School (P S Anegpur) and Upper Primary School (U P S Anegpur) are two school in Anegpur. These schools are managed by Bedmanpur named as its cluster and managed by the Department of Education management. These schools are identified by the government of India Education Department by its code- for primary school and for upper primary school is 9,710,107,501 and 9,710,107,502 respectively. Primary school was recognised as a recognised school by the department of Uttar Pradesh education department in the year 1959, and upper primary school recognised in 2009.
