= Gaharpur =

Gaharpur Gaharpur
- Village
- Location in Uttar Pradesh, India Gaharpur (India)
- Coordinates: 25°17′51″N 82°24′57″E
- Country: India
- State: Uttar Pradesh
- District: Bhadohi

Population (2001)
  - Total: 1,651

Languages
  - Official: Hindi
- Time zone: UTC+5:30 (IST)
- Telephone code: 05414
- Vehicle registration: UP-66
- Sex ratio: 55:45 ♂/♀
- Website: up.gov.in

Gaharpur is one of the Village in Gyanpur Mandal in Bhadohi district in Uttar Pradesh State. Gaharpur is 15 km far from its District Main City Bhadohi . It is 200 km far from its State Main City Lucknow

== Demographics ==
As of 2001 India census, Gaharpur had a population of 1651. Males constitute 55%(903) of the population and females 45%(748)
