= Dhantulasi Uparwar =

Dhantulasi
- village
- Location in Uttar Pradesh, India Dhantulasi (India)
- Coordinates: 25°11′28″N 82°14′24″E
- Country: India
- State: Uttar Pradesh
- District: Bhadohi

Population (2001)
  - Total: 1,536

Languages
  - Official: Hindi
- Time zone: UTC+5:30 (IST)
- PIN: 221309
- Telephone code: 05414
- Vehicle registration: UP-66
- Sex ratio: 49:51 ♂/♀
- Website: up.gov.in

Dhantulasi is a village in Uttar Pradesh, Bhadohi district, Uttar Pradesh State. Dhantulasi is 3.9 km from Itahara Uparwar, 40.8 km from its District Main City Bhadohi and 224 km from its State Main City Lucknow

== Demographics ==
As of 2001 India census, Dhantulasi had a population of 1536. Males constitute 49%(756) of the population and females 51%(780).
