= Ramyatna Shukla =

Indian scholar and linguist (1932–2022)

Acharya Ramyatna Shukla
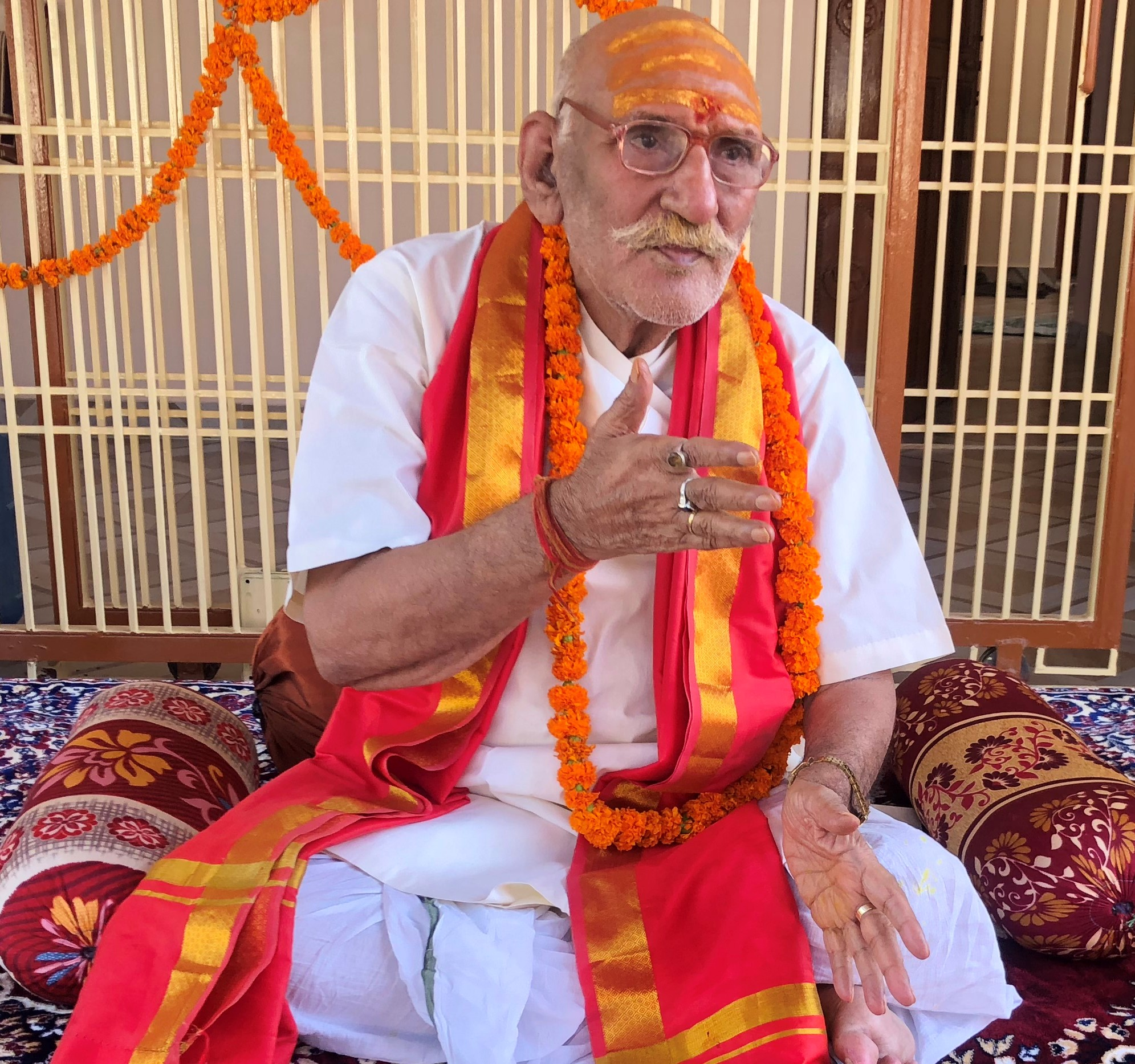
- Acharya Ramyatna Shukla
- Born: 15 January 1932; Bhadohi, Uttar Pradesh, India
- Died: 20 September 2022 (aged 90)
- Education: PhD, D.Lit.
- Alma mater: Sampurnanand Sanskrit Vishwavidyalaya; Indian Institute of Oriental Heritage
- Occupations: Scholar, Linguist
- Known for: Contributions to Sanskrit language and Sanskrit literature
- Notable work: Vyakaran Darshne Shristi Prakriya Vimarsha
- Title: President of Kashi Vidvat Parishad
- Parents: Ramniranjan Shukla (father); Maina Devi (mother)
- Awards: Padma Shri (2021); President Award (1998); Keshav Award; Vachaspati Award; Vishwa Bharti Award

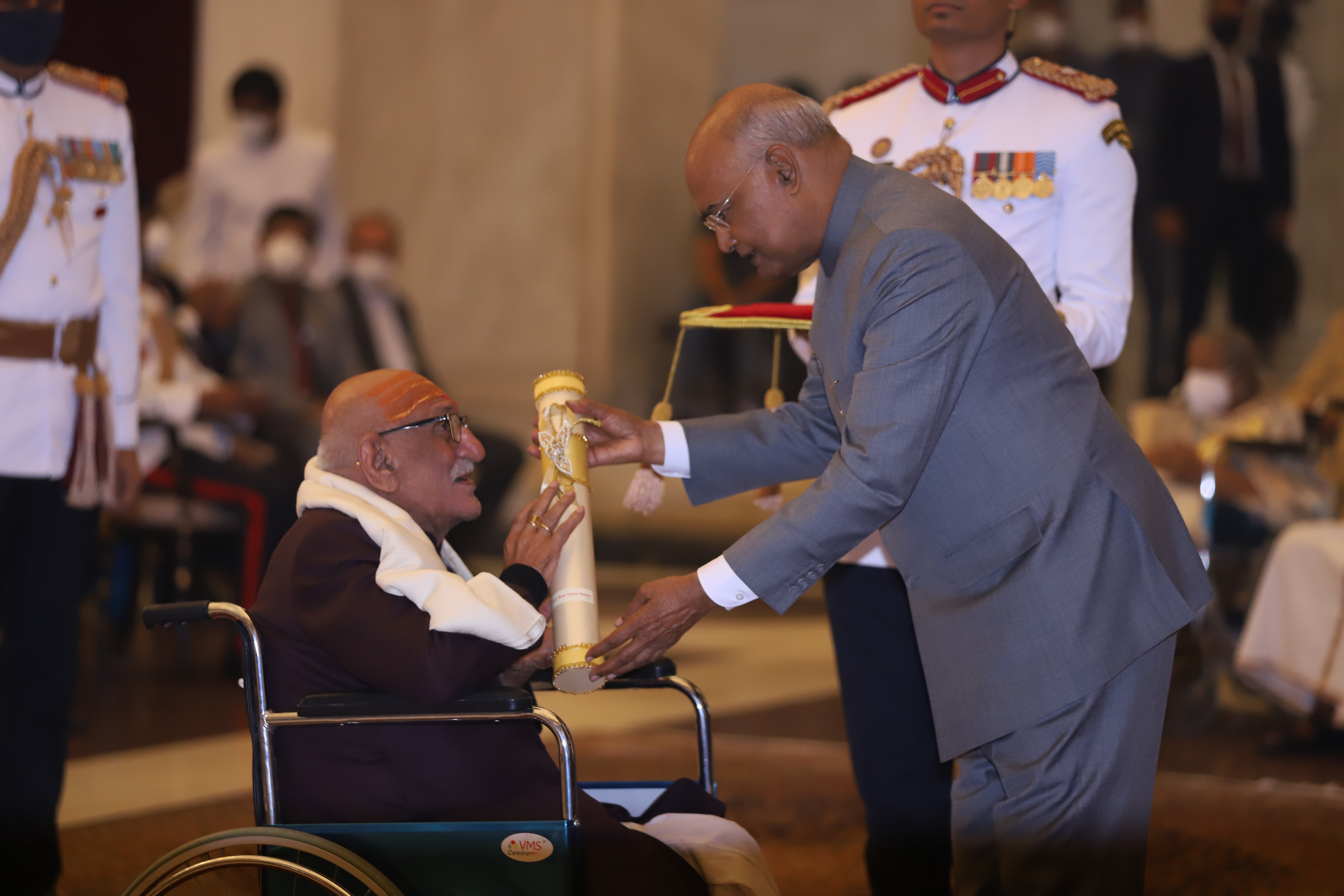
Padma Shree Awardee-2021

Ramyatna Shukla, also written Ram Yatna Shukla (1932−2022) was an Indian scholar and linguist of the Sanskrit Language from Varanasi, Uttar Pradesh and contributed to conserving ancient and Sanskrit texts. He was the President of Kashi Vidvat Parishad, a body of scholars and saints in India. He was also known as Abhinav Panini, named after Sanskrit philologist and grammarian Pāṇini. He contributed to inventing new methods of Sanskrit grammar and Vedanta teaching and modernization. He was the recipient of Padma Shri in 2021. He ran a program to connect the new generation with Sanskrit by providing free education.

== Biography ==
=== Early life ===
Acharya Ramyatna Shukla was born on 15 January 1932 at Village Kala Tulshi which is situated in Bhadohi district of Uttar Pradesh. He holds a PhD from Sampurna Nand Sanskrit University, Varanasi and a D.Lit. from the Indian Institute of Oriental Heritage, Kolkata. His father, Ramniranjan Shukla, was also a renowned scholar of Sanskrit and His mother Maina Devi was House wife. Acharya Ramyatna Shukla had also learned Yoga, Vedas and scriptures from Swami Karpatri and Swami Chetan Bharati.

=== Career ===
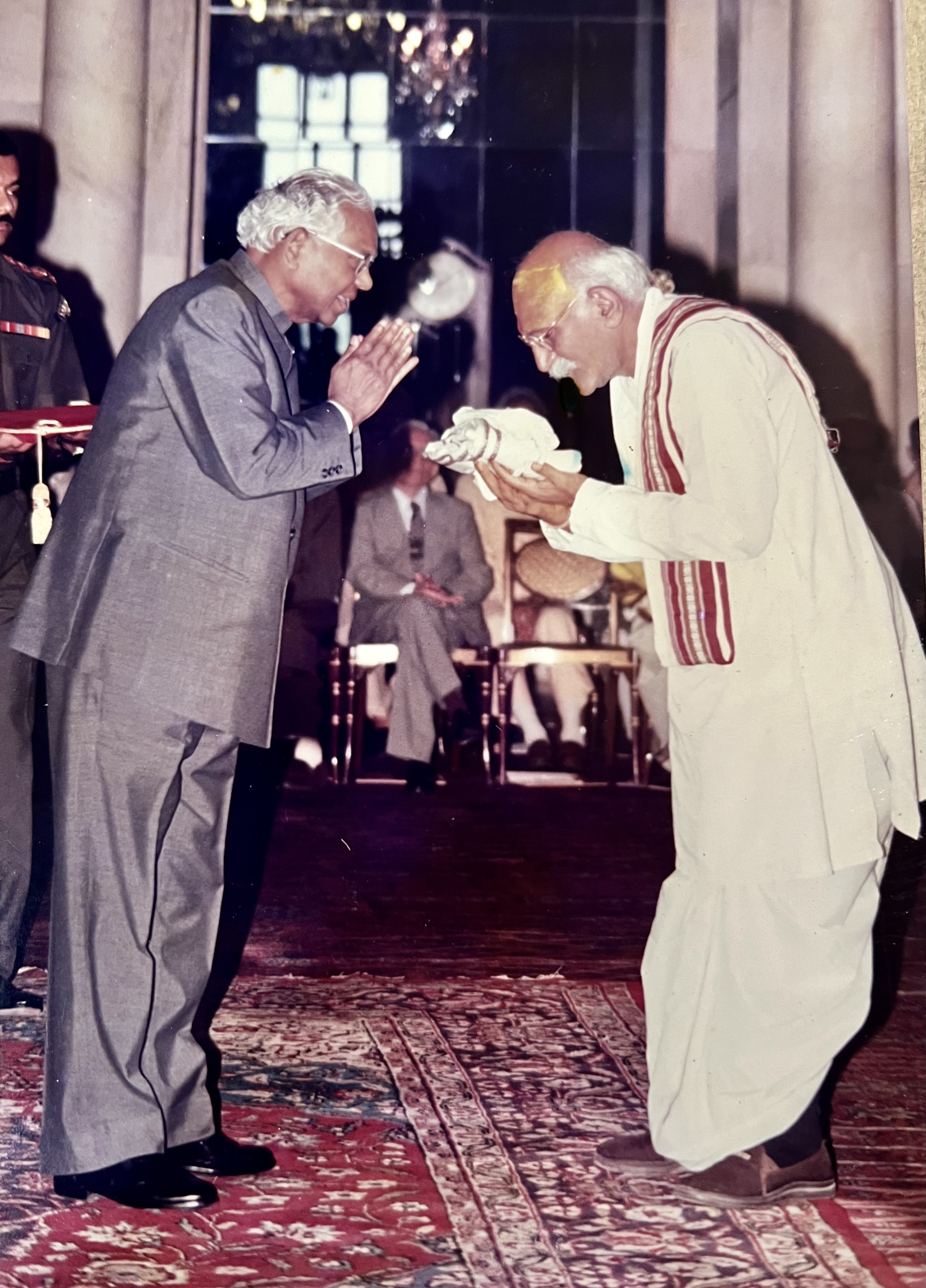
President Award in 1998

He established Uttar Pradesh Nagkoop Sastrath Samiti and Sanatan Sanskriti Samvardhan Parishad, both organisations are engaged in uplifting the Sanskrit language and moral values of society.

He served as the HOD and Dean of Sampurnanand Sanskrit Vishwavidyalaya in 1992. As an educator, he served as the principal, lecturer and visiting faculty of various institutes, including Banaras Hindu University, French Institute of Pondicherry and Shri Lal Bahadur Shastri National Sanskrit University. He has authored many books and his research paper has been published in numerous publications and magazines. Vyakaran Darshne Shristi Prakriya Vimarsha is one of his notable works. He died on 20 September 2022.

== Honours ==
He is the recipient of over 25 awards and a few notable awards include the President Award, Keshav Award, Vachaspati Award and Vishwabharti award. He was given the title of Mahamahopadhyaya. In 2021, Ramyatna Shukla was awarded the fourth highest civilian honour of India Padma Shri in the social work category.

== See also ==
- Pāṇini
