= Auraiya (disambiguation) =

Auraiya is a city and municipal board in Auraiya district, Kanpur division, Uttar Pradesh, India.

Auraiya may also refer to:

- Auraiya district, Uttar Pradesh, India
- Auraiya (Assembly constituency), a constituency of the Uttar Pradesh Legislative Assembly, India
- Auraiya Thermal Power Station, Uttar Pradesh, India
- Auraiya, Nepal, a village

== See also ==
- Aurai (disambiguation)
