= Aurai =

Aurai may refer to:

- Aura (mythology), or Aurai, a Greco-Roman deity
- Aurai (community development block), a community development block in Muzaffarpur district, Bihar, India
  - Aurai, Bihar Assembly constituency, a legislative assembly constituency in Bihar, India
- Aurai, Uttar Pradesh, a town and tehsil in Bhadohi district, Uttar Pradesh, India
  - Aurai, Uttar Pradesh Assembly constituency, a legislative assembly constituency in Uttar Pradesh, India
- Aurai Assembly constituency (disambiguation)

== See also ==
- Auraiya (disambiguation)
- Aurail, a 1990 video game
