= Itahara Uparwar =

Itahara Uparwar Itahara Uparwar
- Village
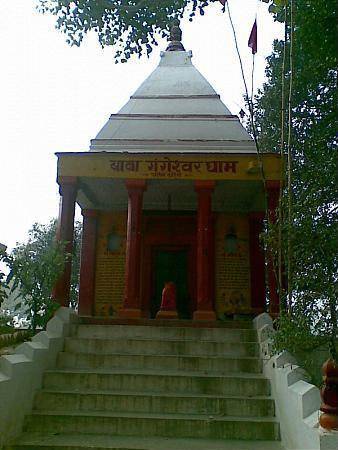
- Baba Gangeshwarnath Dham temple

- Location in Uttar Pradesh, India Itahara Uparwar (India)
- Coordinates: 25°13′26″N 82°13′26″E
- Country: India
- State: Uttar Pradesh
- District: Bhadohi

Government
  - Pradhan: Dr. Ajit singh

Population (2001)
  - Total: 3,192

Languages
  - Official: Hindi
- Time zone: UTC+5:30 (IST)
- PIN: 221309
- Telephone code: 05414
- Vehicle registration: UP-66
- Sex ratio: 52:48 ♂/♀
- Website: up.gov.in

Itahara Uparwar is a village in Deegh Mandal, Bhadohi district, Uttar Pradesh State. Itahara Uparwar is 37.9 km from its District Main City Bhadohi and 221 km from its State Main City Lucknow. At this place the Ganges flows to the west to east.

A temple, Baba Gangeshwarnath Dham, is situated in this village. It was made by Shiv Lal Singh with the help of Kashi Naresh.

== Demographics ==
As of 2001 India census, Itahara Uparwar had a population of 3192. Males constitute 52% (1655) of the population and females 48% (1537); now its population is about 7069.
