= Gird Baragaon =

Gird Baragaon is situated at Sant Ravidas Nagar in Uttar Pradesh. This is the second largest village in this district. The population of this village is nearly 6,000. The village is divided into two sub-villages, gird Baragaon and Dih baragaon.
