= Bharuhana =

- Census town
- Location in Uttar Pradesh, India
- Coordinates: 25°08′06″N 82°35′46″E
- Country: India
- State: Uttar Pradesh
- District: Mirzapur

Population (2001)
  - Total: 5,734

Language
  - Official: Hindi
  - Additional official: Urdu
- Time zone: UTC+5:30 (IST)

Bharuhana is a census town in Mirzapur district in the state of Uttar Pradesh, India.

== Demographics ==
As of 2001 India census, Bharuhana had a population of 5,734. Males constitute 54% of the population and females 46%. Bharuhana has an average literacy rate of 56%, lower than the national average of 59.5%; with male literacy of 65% and female literacy of 44%. 15% of the population is under 6 years of age.
