= Raipuria =

Village in Uttar Pradesh, India

Coordinates: 25°07′55″N 82°53′57″E

Raipuria is a village in Mirzapur district, Uttar Pradesh, India.
