= Sitamarhi Bankat =

Sitamarhi Bankat Bankat
- Village
- Interactive map of Sitamarhi Bankat
- Country: India
- State: Uttar Pradesh
- District: Bhadohi
- Tehsil: Gyanpur

Government
  - Type: Panchayat raj
  - Body: Gram panchayat

Population (2011)
  - Total: 4,194
  - Total Households: 570
  - Village code: 221,309

Languages
  - Official: Hindi
- Time zone: UTC+5:30 (IST)
- Pin Code: 221309
- Website: https://bhadohi.nic.in/tourist-place/sita-samahit-sthal/

Sitamarhi Bankat is a Hindu village situated in Sant Ravidas Nagar Bhadohi District Uttar Pradesh, India.This village is located on the banks of Ganga river and 11 km from Jangiganj Bazar in the middle of prayagraj and Varanasi.

It is also known as 'Sita Samahit Sthal' as there was a huge statue of lord hanuman of 110 feet high, which has the distinction of being the world's greatest statue of Lord Hanuman.
