= Karigaon =

Coordinates: 26.556168°N 90.33991°E

Karigaon is a village near Nathaipur in Gyanpur in Bhadohi district in the Indian state of Uttar Pradesh.
