= Kolound =

Village in Uttar Pradesh, India

Kolound is a small village in district Mirzapur, Uttar Pradesh, India, It is situated roughly around 28 km from Varanasi and 55 km from Mirzapur. It has a mixed population of Hindu and Muslim with a population of around 3,000 people. It has a small temple close to a pond at the back side of village and a mosque in the center of village.

This village is full with farmers and government servants especially in military, BSF, CRPF, PAC & district police.

== Education ==
Education level is not very good. Although it does have a government school and a few private schools have also been opened recently, notably the SUNBEAM School which provides a good quality of education.

== Basic infrastructure ==
It has a small water canal used for irrigation but the farmers do not benefit from it as it has passed from outer areas only and is also deep. The village has recently got approval by state government for cemented roads along with solar street lights. People uses hand pumps and wells for drinking water. Electricity is very poor, supplied only 6 hours each day, alternating weekly between day and night use.
