= Bakiabad =

- Census town
- Location in Uttar Pradesh, India Bakiabad (India)
- Coordinates: 25°06′39″N 82°53′59″E
- Country: India
- State: Uttar Pradesh
- District: Mirzapur

Population (2001)
  - Total: 3,979

Language
  - Official: Hindi
  - Additional official: Urdu
- Time zone: UTC+5:30 (IST)
- Vehicle registration: UP
- Website: up.gov.in

Bakiabad is a census town in Mirzapur district in the state of Uttar Pradesh, India.

== Demographics ==
As of 2001 India census, Bakiabad had a population of 3979. Males constitute 53% of the population and females 47%. Bakiabad has an average literacy rate of 71%, higher than the national average of 59.5%; with 60% of the males and 40% of females literate. 11% of the population is under 6 years of age.
