= Kewtaveer =

- Village
- Location in Uttar Pradesh, India Kewtaveer (India)
- Coordinates: 25.22°N 82.67°E
- Country: India
- State: Uttar Pradesh
- District: Mirzapur
- Elevation: 84 m (276 ft)

Population (2001)
  - Total: 3,417

Languages
  - Official: Hindi
- Time zone: UTC+5:30 (IST)
- Vehicle registration: UP
- Sex ratio: 53.7% (M)/46.23% (F) ♂/♀
- Website: up.gov.in

Kewtaveer (Kewatabir) is a village situated on the banks of the river Ganges in the Indian state of Uttar Pradesh in India.

== Geography ==
Kewatabir is located at 25.22°N 82.67°E. It has an average elevation of 84 metres (275 feet). It is around 40 km. away from Varanasi Cantt.
