= Aurai Assembly constituency =

Aurai Assembly constituency may refer to these electoral constituencies in India:

- Aurai, Bihar Assembly constituency
- Aurai, Uttar Pradesh Assembly constituency

== See also ==
- Aurai (disambiguation)
