= Sita Samahit Sthal =

Hindu Temple in Prayagraj,Uttar Pradesh, India

Sita Samahit Sthal (Sitamarhi) Temple
- सीता समाहित स्थल (सीतामढ़ी)
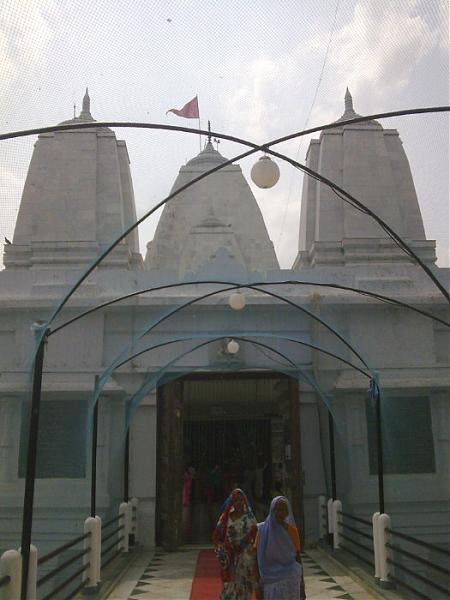

- Location within Uttar Pradesh

Religion
- Affiliation: Hinduism
- District: Bhadohi district
- Deity: Sita
- Festival: Ram Navami

Location
- Location: Bhadohi
- State: Uttar Pradesh
- Country: India
- Interactive map of Sita Samahit Sthal (Sitamarhi) Temple
- Coordinates: 25°14′26″N 82°19′58″E

Architecture
- Type: Mandir
- Creator: Sri Prakash Narayan punj
- Completed: 1990

Sita Samahit Sthal (Sitamarhi), the holy place of Sitamarhi is situated between Prayagraj and Varanasi, near the national highway No. 2 and also connected with Prayagraj and Varanasi railway line with Jangiganj, the nearest railway station. It is a well known Hindu pilgrimage in the poorvanchal region of Uttar Pradesh .

== Mythic origins ==
It is said that this temple is the place where Sita went into the earth when she willed it while she was living in residential hermitage of Saint Valmiki in the forest of Sitamarhi. It was Saint Valmiki who wrote Ramayana. According to Ramayana and other sacred books of Hindu dharma, when Lord Rama returned from the grand victory on Ravana the powerful king of Lanka. After becoming the king of Ayodhya a big yaga was held by Lord Rama and the horse of that grand yagya Ashvamedha was released from Ayodhya, the horse was to move in any direction or in any kingdom, the king of that kingdom should have to declare Rama as his Emperor. When the horse was wandering in the jungle of now Baripur village of Bhadohi, the two sons of Sita captured the horse according to the declaration that was tagged on the forehead of the horse. All the great warriors of Lord Rama Including Laxman, Bharat, Saturghna, Sugreev, Nal-Neel were defeated in the fierce battle between the two Lav and Kush the most powerful Hanuman was tied by them. At last the great Rama had to come to that place to fight the two children . No one knew that both boys are the prince of Ayodhaya and the son of Rama. When Rama came to the battlefield, all the holy souls of the three world comes to see the rare scene and Sita also comes to Lord Rama and said with folded palm that she served with Her all efforts and love and it was time to end this human life (note human life because they were God and Goddess) after she asked Her mother (the earth) to take her into her lap. She left behind Her two sons Luv and Kush whom Lord Rama took to the Ayodhya empire.

== Gallery ==
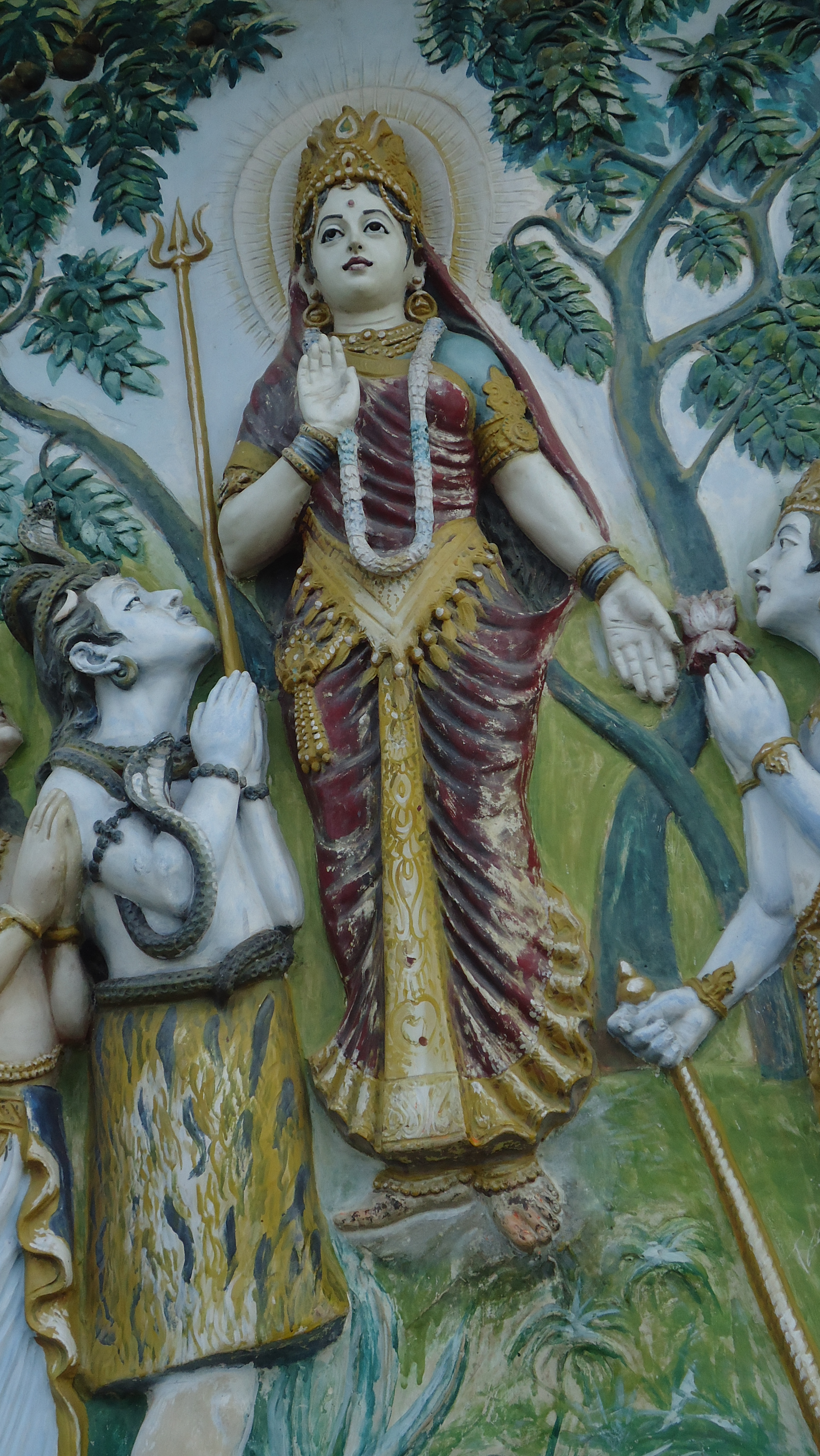

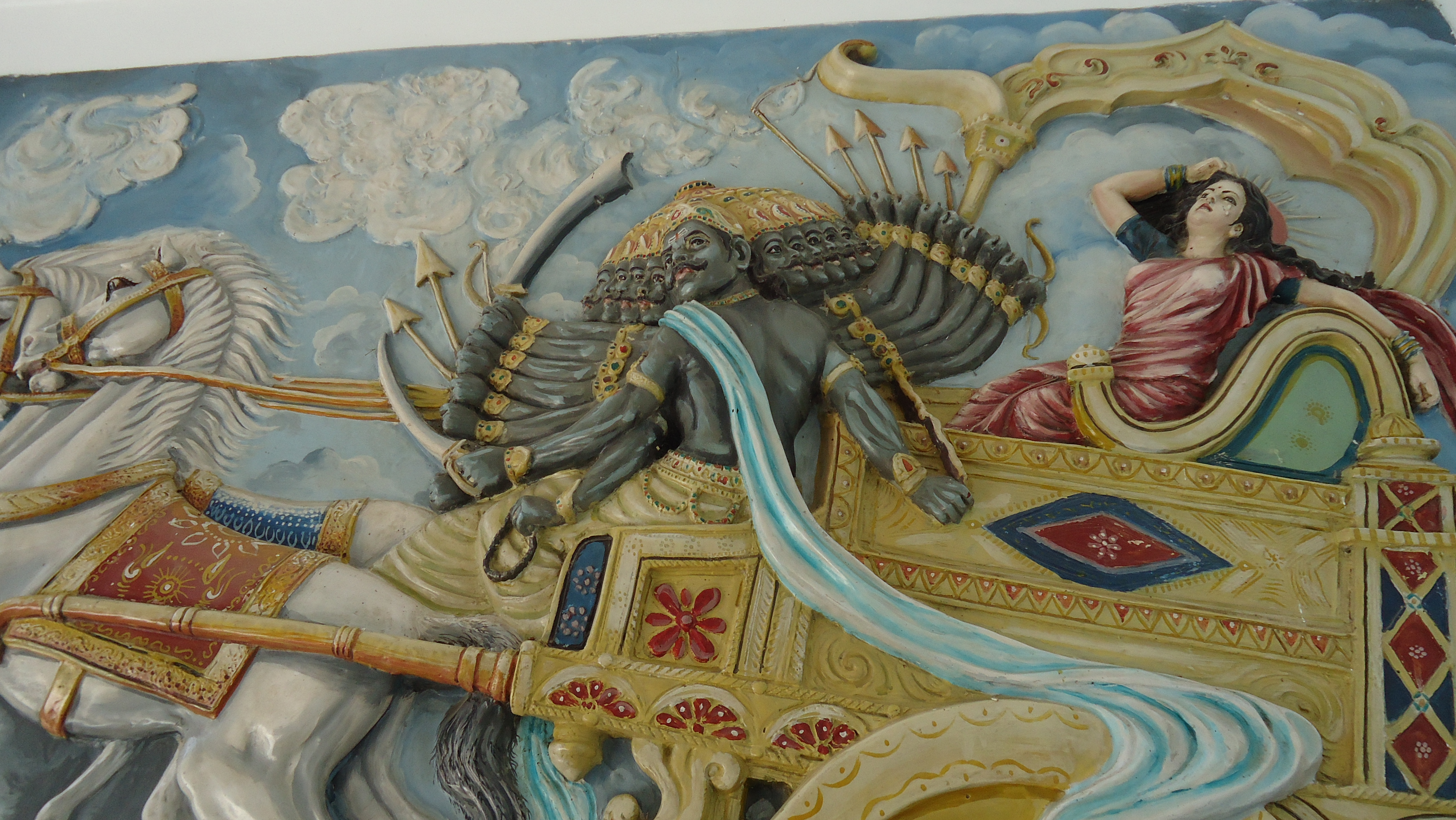

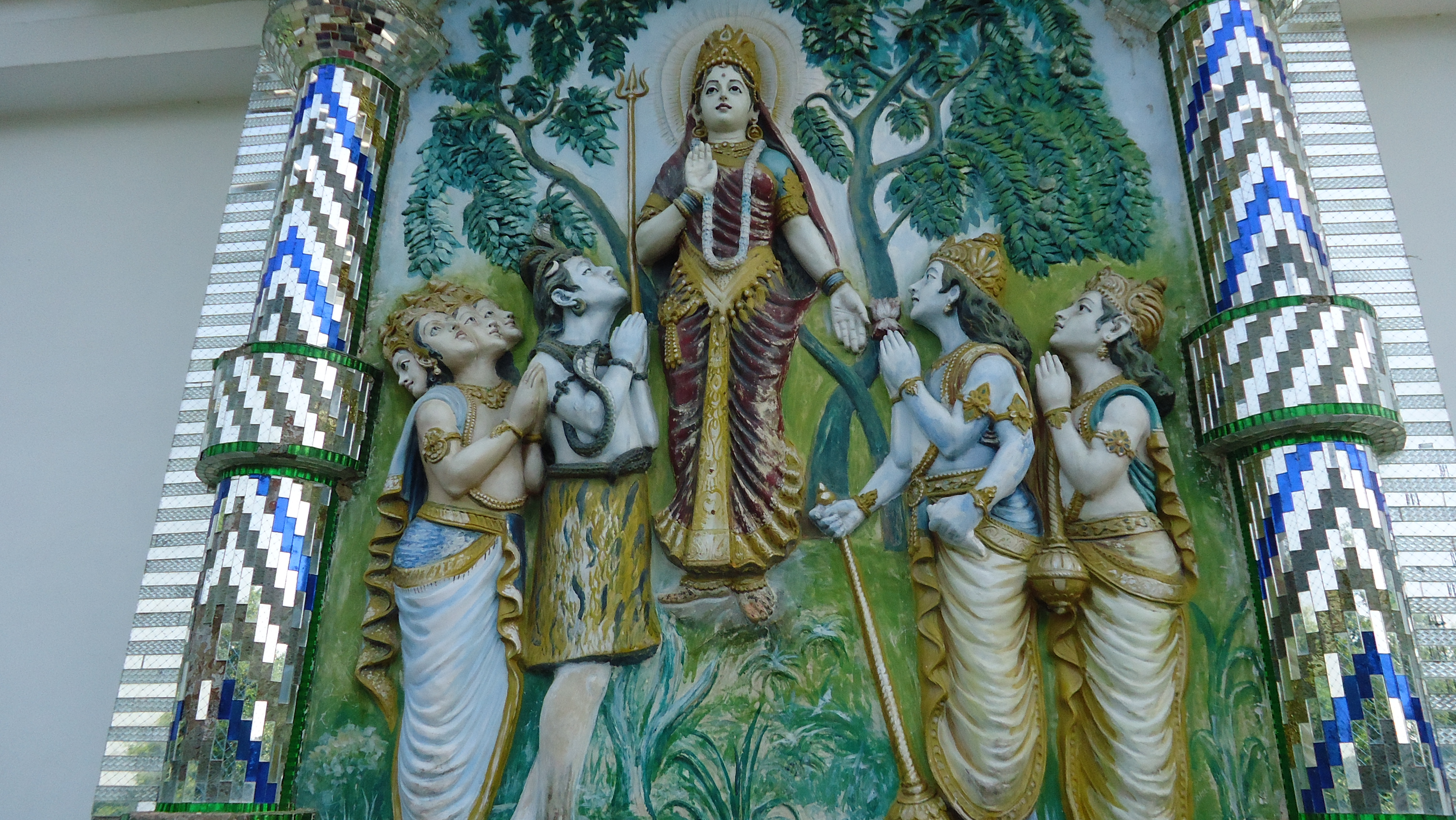

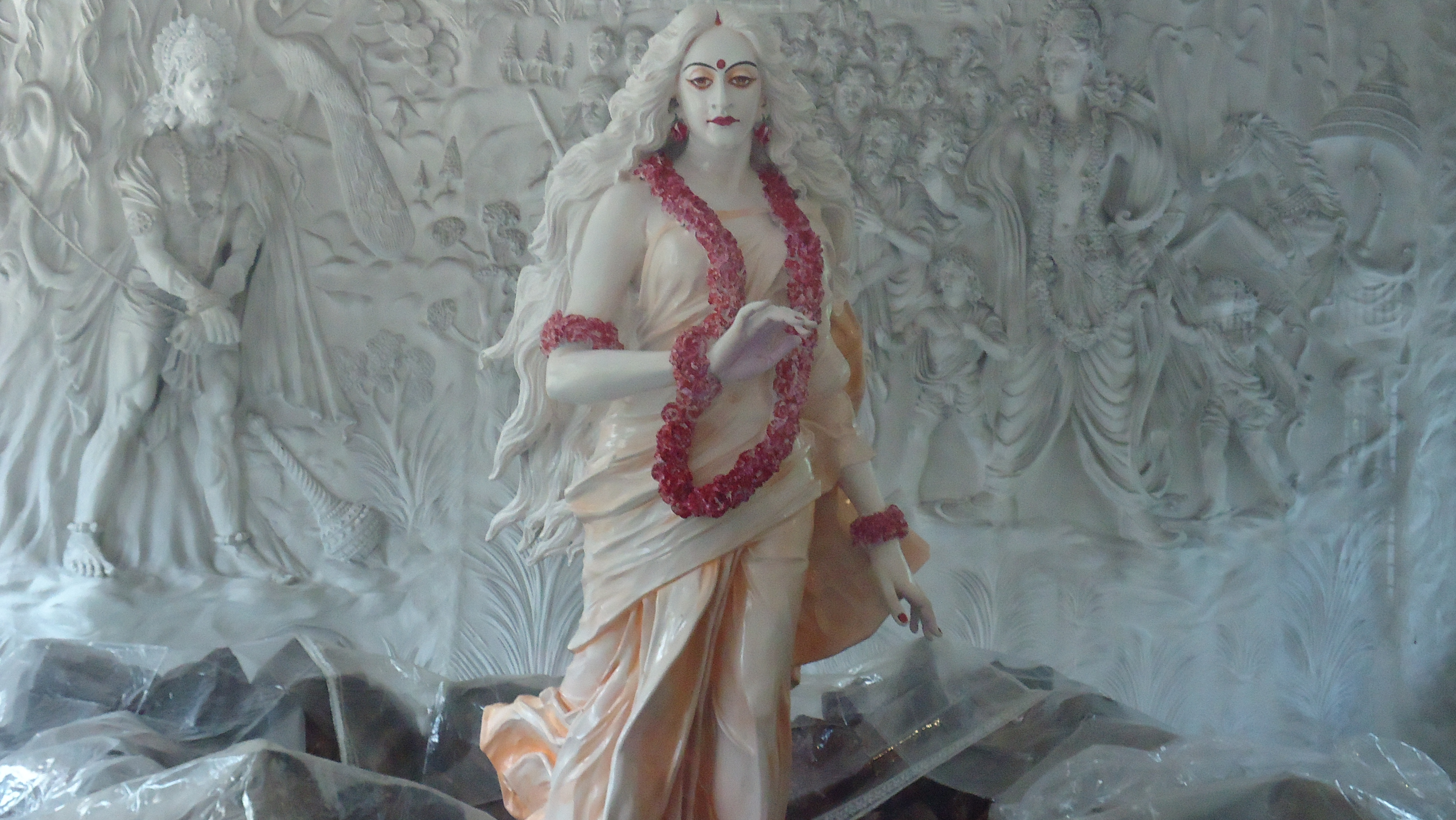

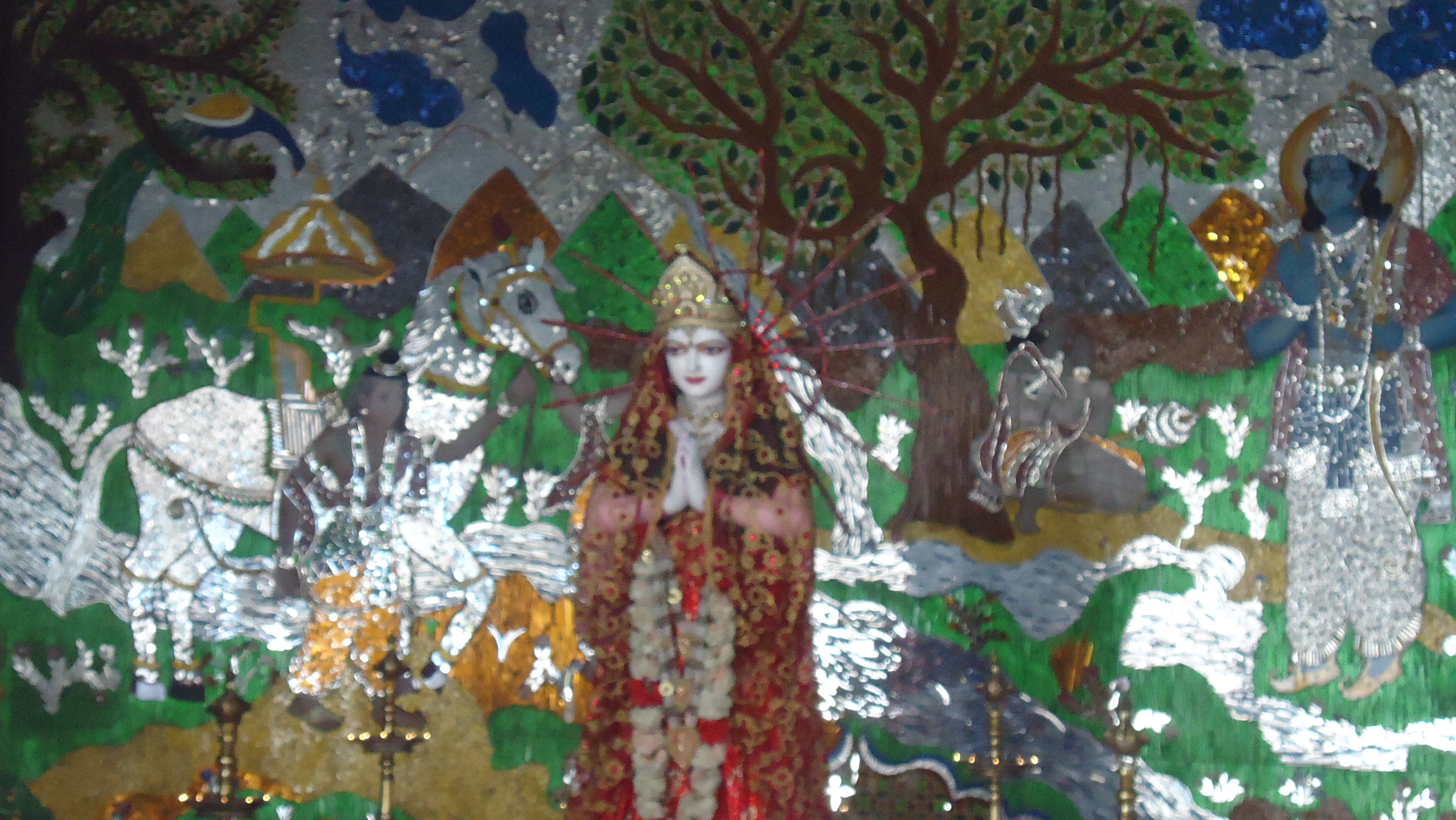

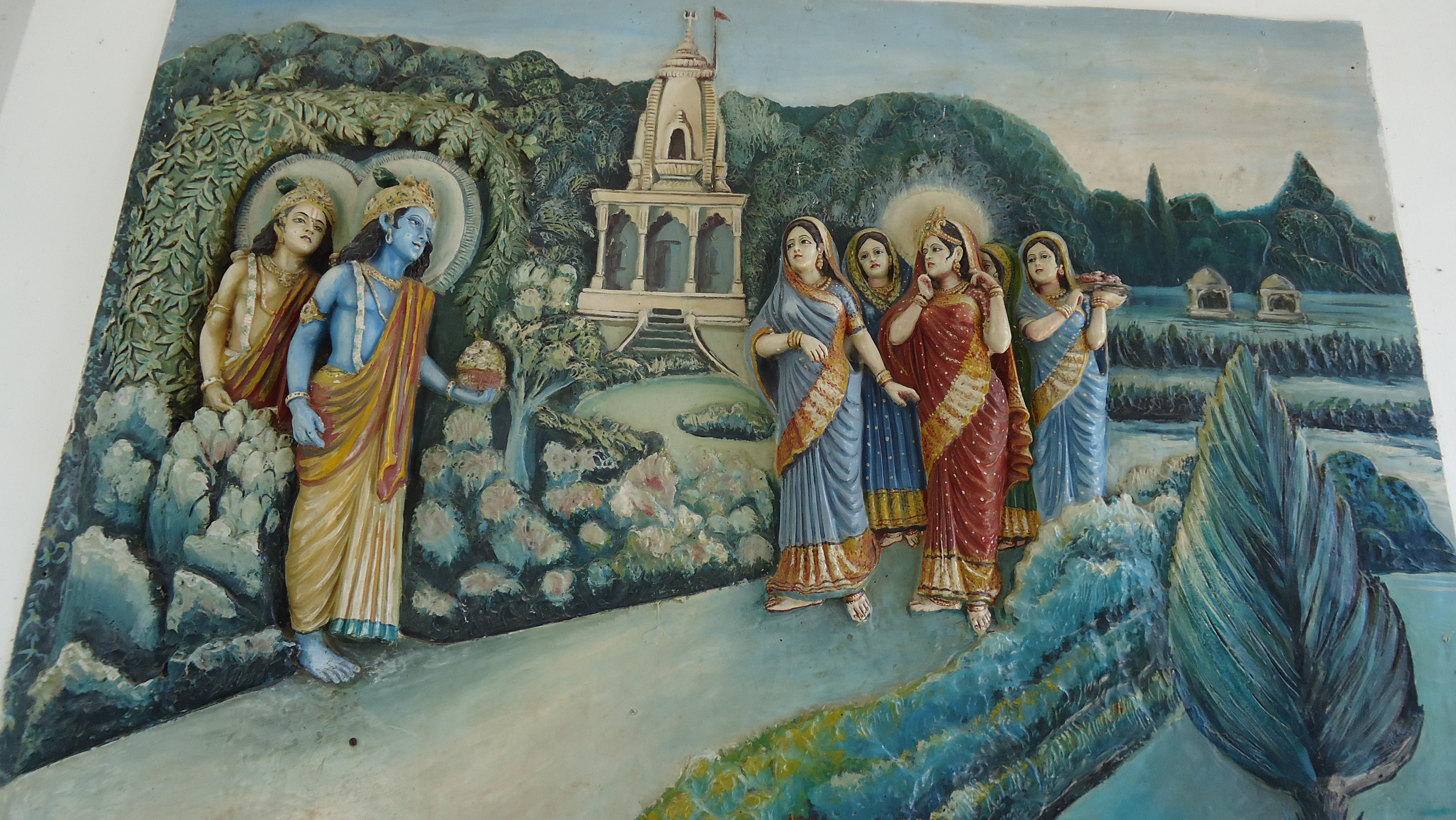

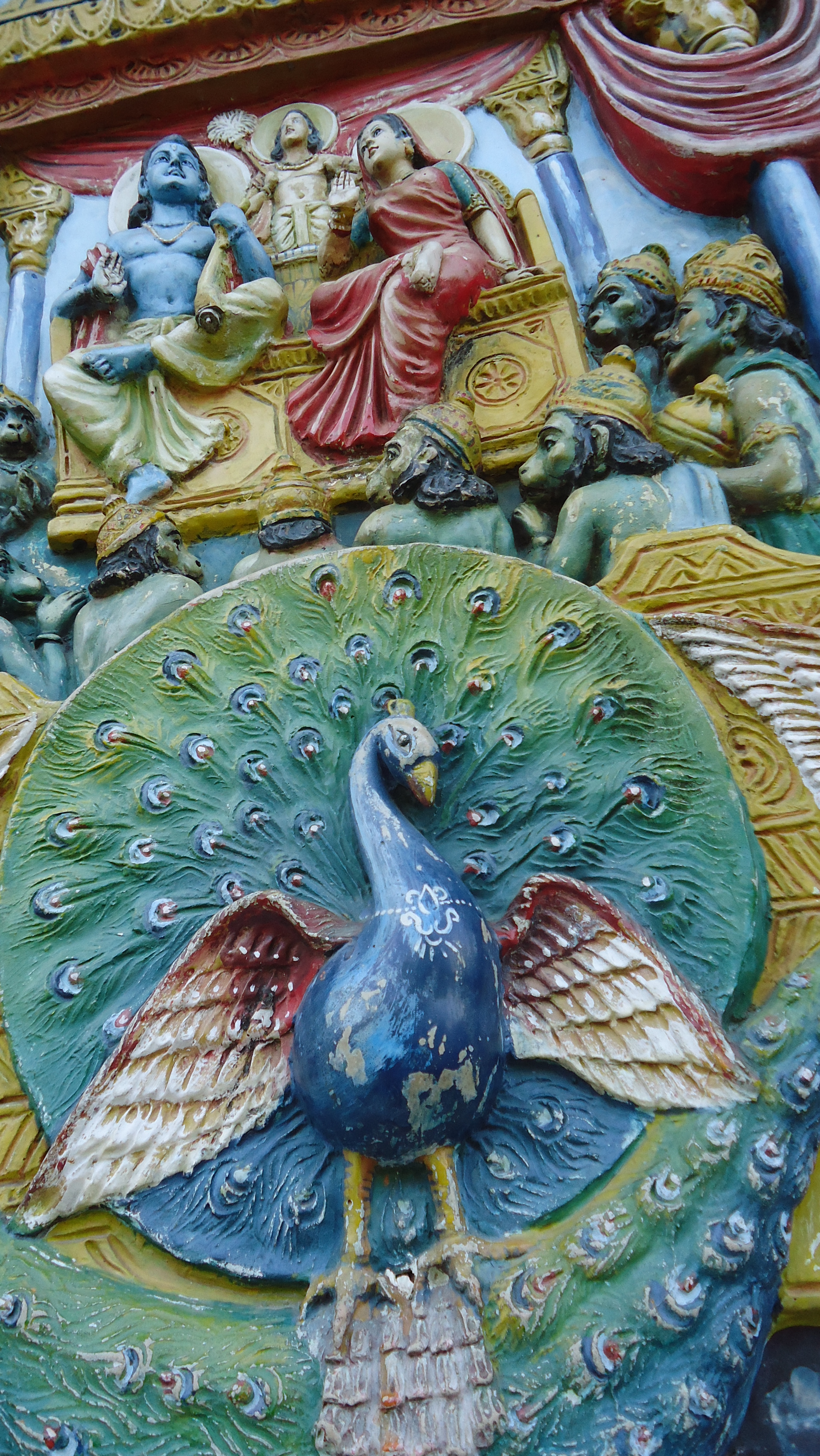
