= Duguna Uparwar =

- Village
- Location in Uttar Pradesh, India Duguna Uparwar (India)
- Coordinates: 25°13′43″N 82°12′45″E
- Country: India
- State: Uttar Pradesh
- District: Bhadohi

Government
  - Body: Gram panchayat

Languages
  - Official: Hindi
- Time zone: UTC+5:30 (IST)
- PIN: 221309
- Telephone code: 05414
- Vehicle registration: UP-66
- Website: up.gov.in

Duguna Uparwar is a village in Deegh Mandal, Bhadohi district, Uttar Pradesh State.
