= Deeghuparwar =

Deeghuparwar Deegh Uparwar
- Village
- Location in Uttar Pradesh, India Deeghuparwar (India)
- Coordinates: 25°14′30″N 82°13′59″E
- Country: India
- State: Uttar Pradesh
- District: Bhadohi

Government
  - Body: Gram panchayat

Population (2001)
  - Total: 9,029

Languages
  - Official: Hindi
- Time zone: UTC+5:30 (IST)
- PIN: 221309
- Telephone code: 05414
- Vehicle registration: UP-66
- Sex ratio: 52:48 ♂/♀
- Website: up.gov.in

Deeghuparwar is a village in Deegh mandal in Bhadohi district in Uttar Pradesh State in India. Deegh Uparwar is 31.9 km from its District Main City Bhadohi and 215 km from its State Main City Lucknow.

== Demographics ==
As of 2001 India census, Deegh Uparwar had a population of 9029. Males constitute 52% (4672) of the population and females 48% (4357).
