= Aurai, Uttar Pradesh =

Aurai tehsil
- city
- Location in Uttar Pradesh, India Aurai tehsil (India)
- Coordinates: 25.28°N 82.55°E
- Country: India
- State: Uttar Pradesh
- District: Bhadohi
- Elevation: 81 m (266 ft)

Population (2011)
  - Total: 318,606

Languages
  - Official: Hindi
- Time zone: UTC+5:30 (IST)
- Vehicle registration: UP
- Website: up.gov.in

Aurai is a town and a tehsil in Bhadohi district, Uttar Pradesh state, India. It is a newly created tehsil which came into inception in the year 2008. It is 23 km from its district headquarter of City Gyanpur and 235 km from the state capital of Lucknow. Aurai is also a legislative assembly seat for Uttar Pradesh Legislative Assembly (also known as Vidhan Sabha). Aurai is also a Panchayat Samiti (District Sub-Division).

== Aurai Tehsil ==
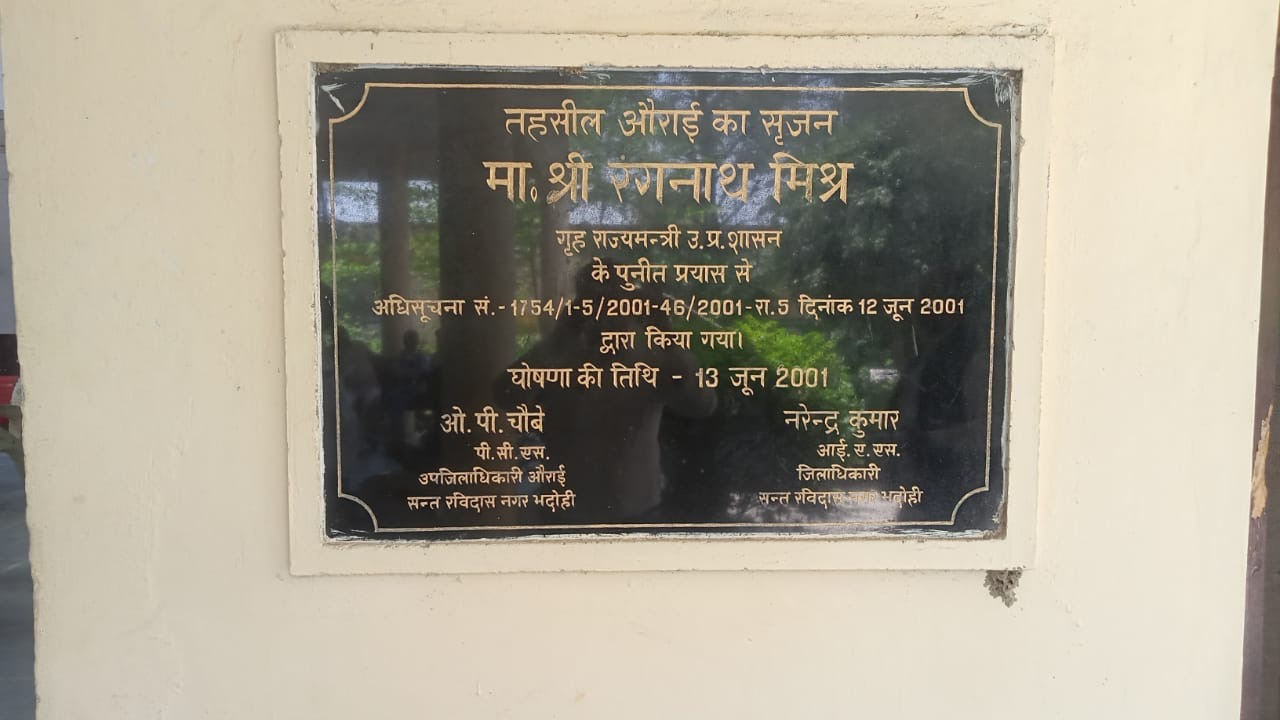
A foundation stone laid at Tehsil Aurai.

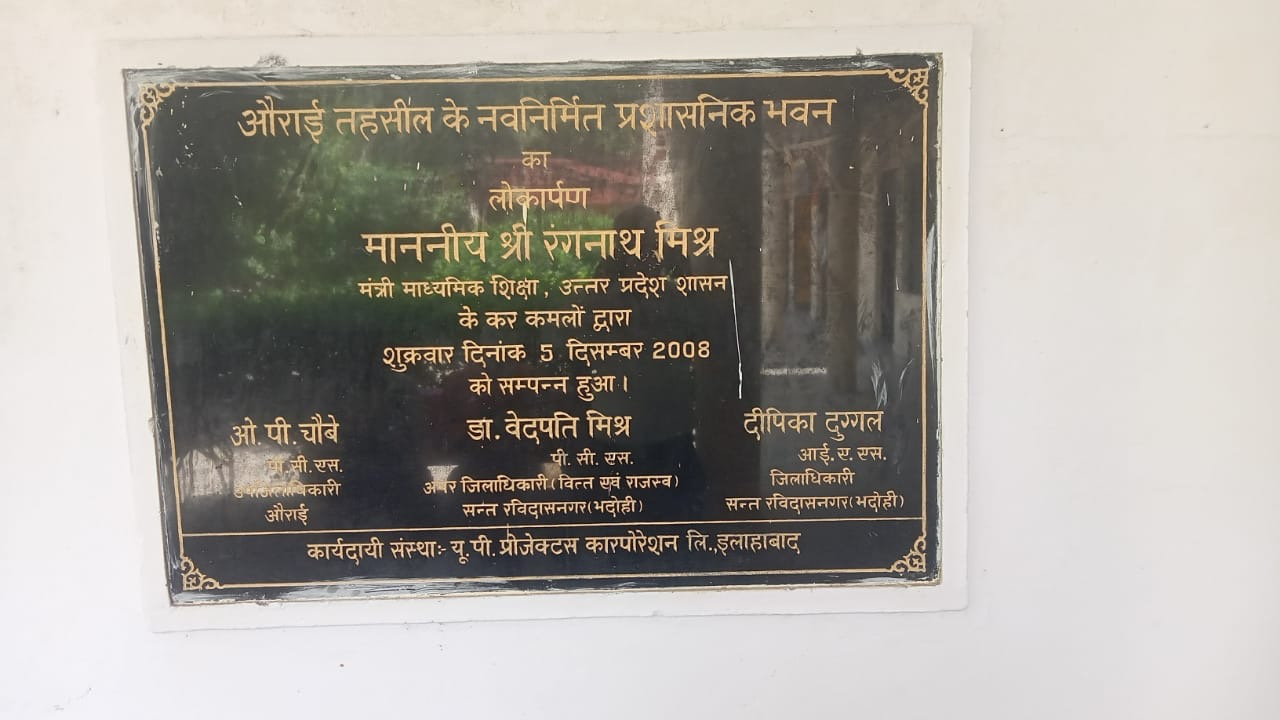
A second foundation stone at Tehsil Aurai.

Aurai Tehsil is one of the three tehsils in the District of Bhadohi, Uttar Pradesh. It has been newly created after 2001 Census by transferring the villages of Tahsil Bhadohi and Tahsil Gyanpur. It consists of 355 villages under its division. It has a population of 4,41,427. The sex ratio in Tehsil Aurai is 941 females per 1,000 males. It was created through the Gazette Notification dated 12 June, 2001. It came into existence through the efforts of then MLA (Member of Legislative Assembly) and minister Rangnath Mishra.

== Aurai Block ==
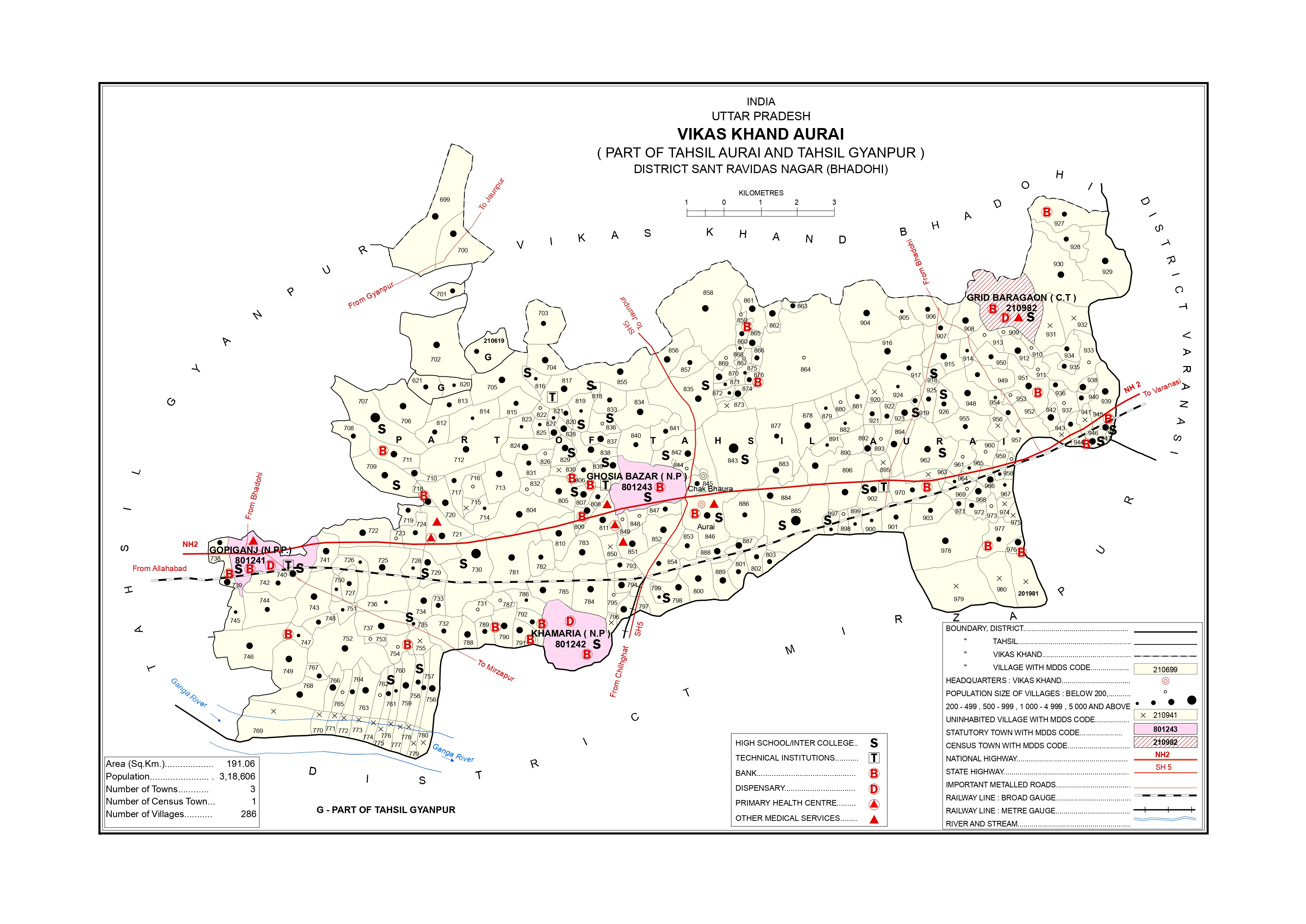
Aurai Block Map (2011 Census)

Aurai block is one of the six blocks (Panchayat Samiti) in the District Bhadohi. It consists of 286 villages. It is the most populous block with the population of 3,13,365. The sex ratio in block Aurai is 938 females per 1,000 males.

== Aurai Legislative Assembly Seat ==
Aurai is one of the three Legislative Assembly seat in the Bhadohi district. It is one of five assembly constituencies in the Bhadohi Lok Sabha constituency. Since 2008, this assembly constituency is numbered 394 amongst 403 constituencies. For more refer to - Aurai, Uttar Pradesh Assembly constituency.
