= Auraiya, Nepal =

Village development committee in Narayani Zone, Nepal

Auraiya औरैया
- Village development committee
- Location in Nepal
- Coordinates: 26.78°N 85.23°E
- Country: Nepal
- Zone: Narayani Zone
- District: Rautahat District

Population (2001)
  - Total: 8,836
- Time zone: UTC+5:45 (Nepal Time)

Auraiya was a village development committee in Rautahat District in the Narayani Zone of south-eastern Nepal. Now after formation of local government, Auraiya is in Ishnath Municipality. Auraiya is 6 km (3.7 mi) west of the district headquarters Gaur. The village takes its name from "Amla" which means "Indian gooseberry". At the time of the 2014 Nepal census it had a population of 10,832 (5,630 male and 5,202 female; 93.17% Hindu and 6.83% Muslim), in more than 1648 households. The literacy rate is 77%, which is higher than average in Nepal. Most of the people of the village are employed in the "government services" of Nepal like engineering, forestry, medicine, and education.

== Border ==
Its borders Bihar in south, with the two villages Hirapur and Mahanguwa.
