= Khamaria =

- Town
- Location in Uttar Pradesh, India Khamaria (India)
- Coordinates: 25°14′33″N 82°30′30″E
- Country: India
- State: Uttar Pradesh
- District: Bhadohi
- Named for: Carpets

Government
  - Type: Local government
  - Body: Legislative

Population (2011)
  - Total: 35,929

Languages
  - Official: Hindi
- Time zone: UTC+5:30 (IST)
- Vehicle registration: UP 66
- Website: up.gov.in

Khamaria is a town and a nagar panchayat in Bhadohi district in the Indian state of Uttar Pradesh.

== Demographics ==
As of 2001 India census, Khamaria had a population of 27,581. Males constitute 48% of the population and females 52%. Khamaria has an average literacy rate of 36%, well below the national average of 59.5%: male literacy is 66%, and female literacy is 45%. In Khamaria, 11% of the population is under 6 years of age and 19% of the population is above 67 years of age. The town has a major hospital (Khamaria Hospital) and have a degree college (R.S.L. Intermediate College). It has many carpet manufacturing export houses.
