= Khamariya =

Village in Madhya Pradesh, India

Coordinates: 24°12′N 79°12′E

Khamhariya (rewa) is a village and a gram panchayat under semariya Vidhan sabha Constituency in rewa district in the Indian state of Madhya Pradesh.

Khamhariya is situated on the bank of the river Beehad, 8 km away from rewa. The Khamhariya was the independent Pawai (including many other villages named sumeda, babupur and bakhiya

Khamhariya was an independent pawai and has never fallen under the area of so-called Ilakedar's of rewa. Independent pawai means the taxes of the village was directly deposited to the Maharaj of rewa.
