= Kapil Deva Dvivedi =

Indian academic

Dr. Kapil Deva Dvivedi is the director of Vishva Bharati Research Institute, and a noted Sanskrit scholar in India. He has published over 70 books on Vedic and Sanskrit Literature. In 1991 he was awarded a Padma Shri for Literature & Education.

He has received several awards for his contribution in Sanskrit Grammar.

Some of his awarded books are:

- Śarmaṇyāḥ Prācyavidaḥ, biographies of fifty German Indologists in Sanskrit
- Artha-Vigyana Aur Vyakarana-Darshana
- Sanskrit Vyakarana
- Sanskrit Nibandha Shatakam
- Rashtra Gitanjalih
- Bhakti Kusumanjalih
- Atharva Veda ka Sanskritik Adhyayana
- Vedon Men Ayurveda
- Atma Vijnanam
- Vedon Men Rajniti Shastra
- Vedon men Vigyan
- Sanskrit Vyakaran evam Laghusiddhantkaumudi
