= Gyanpur =

- Town
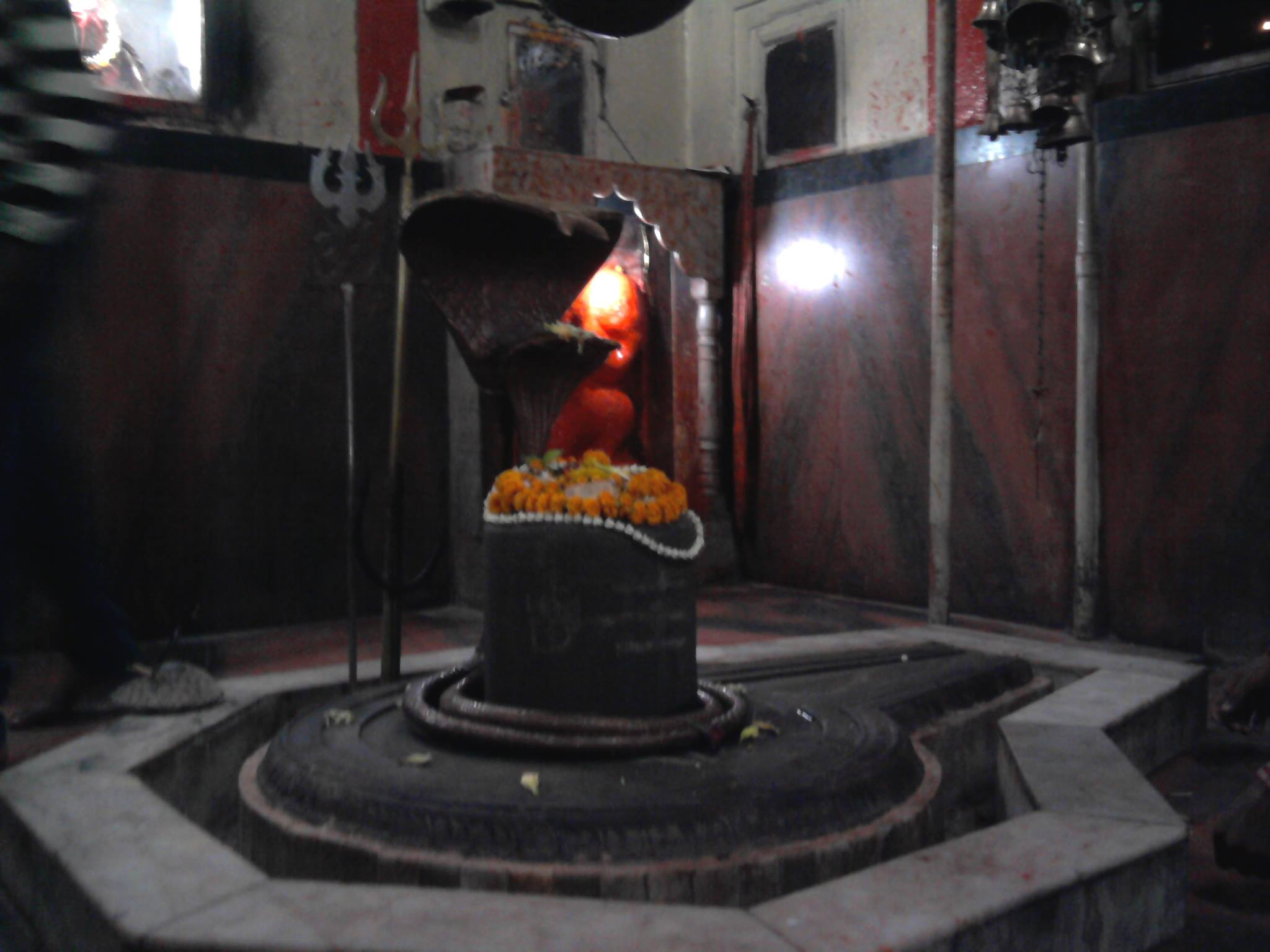
- Hariharnath Mandir, Gyanpur
- Nickname: city of education
- Location in Uttar Pradesh, India
- Coordinates: 25.35°N 82.47°E
- Country: India
- State: Uttar Pradesh
- District: Bhadohi

Government
  - Type: Democratic
- Elevation: 81 m (266 ft)

Population (2011)
  - Total: 45,808

Language
  - Official: Hindi
  - Additional official: Urdu
  - Regional: Awadhi
- Time zone: UTC+5:30 (IST)
- Vehicle registration: UP-66

Gyanpur is a town and a nagar panchayat in Bhadohi district in the Indian state of Uttar Pradesh.

== Geography ==
Gyanpur is located at 25.35°N 82.47°E. It has an average elevation of 81 metres (265 feet).

== Demographics ==
As of 2011 Indian Census, Gyanpur had a total population of 45,808, of which 26,908 were males and 19,900 were females. Population within the age group of 0 to 6 years was 1,622. The total number of literates in Gyanpur was 9,315, which constituted 72.7% of the population with male literacy of 78.3% and female literacy of 66.2%. The effective literacy rate of 7+ population of Gyanpur was 83.3%, of which male literacy rate was 89.3% and female literacy rate was 76.1%. The Scheduled Castes and Scheduled Tribes population was 1,167 and 19 respectively. Gyanpur had 2024 households in 2011.

As of 2001 India census, Gyanpur had a population of 12,056. Males constitute 54% of the population and females 46%. The total number of literates in Gyanpur was 7,897 which is 65.5% of the total population. In Gyanpur, 15% of the population is under 6 years of age. The effective literacy of 7+ population was 77.4%.

== Transportation ==
=== Railways ===
Gyanpur Road Railway station is situated in Gopiganj, Uttar Pradesh. Station code of Gyanpur Road is (GYN).

== Education ==
=== Schools ===
Jawahar Navodaya Vidyalaya, established in 1991, is a CBSE affiliated school covering classes from VI to XII.

== Villages ==
- Karigaon bhudaki

== Gallery ==
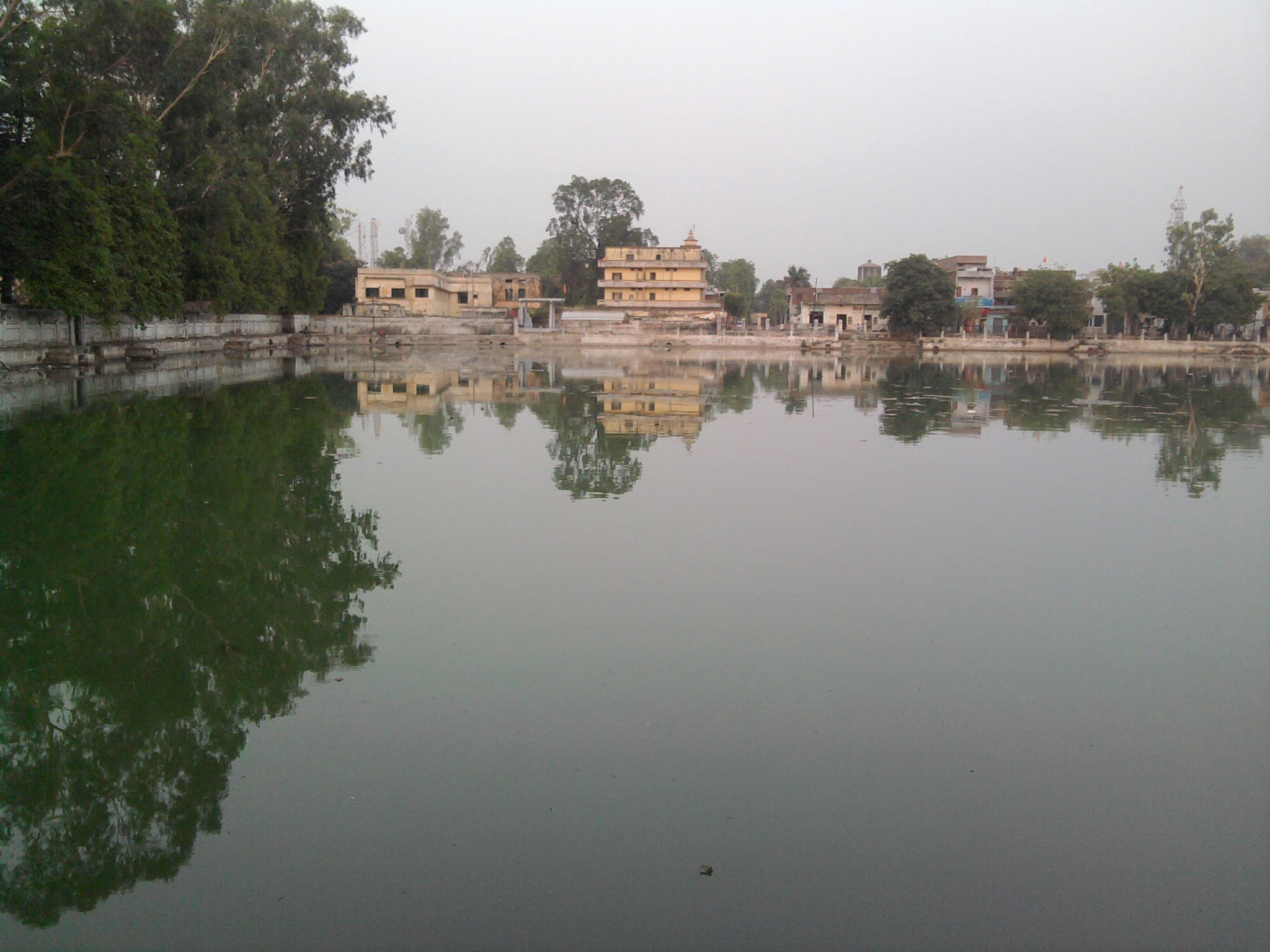
Hariharnath Mandir, Gyanpur

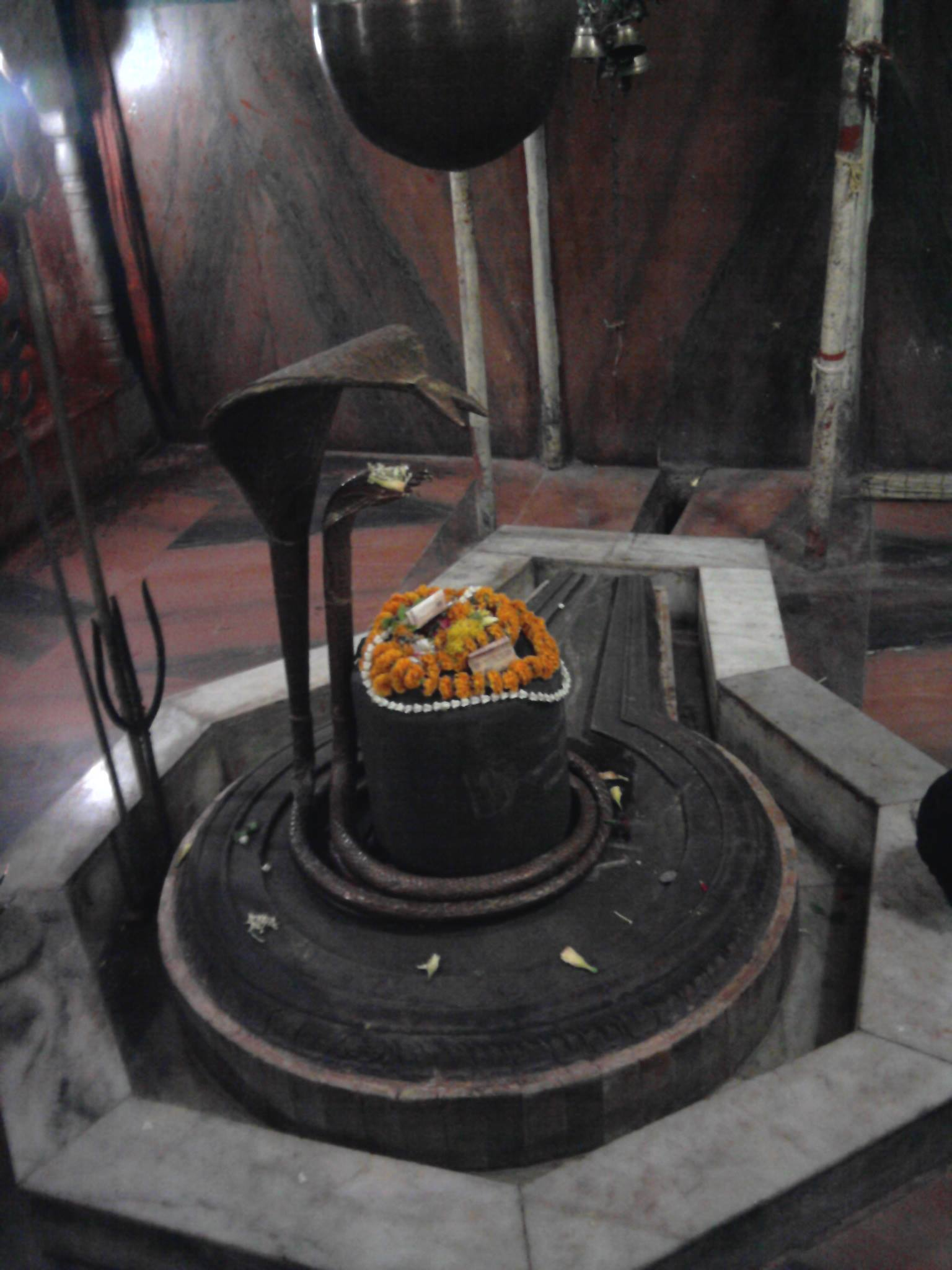
Hariharnath Mandir, Gyanpur, jagannathpur, mahadevpur
