= Deegh =

Deegh Deegh
- Block
- Location in Uttar Pradesh, India
- Coordinates: 25°17′31″N 82°18′29″E
- Country: India
- State: Uttar Pradesh
- District: Bhadohi

Government
  - Block Pramukh: Neeta Soni

Languages
  - Official: Hindi
- Time zone: UTC+5:30 (IST)
- PIN: 221309
- Telephone code: 05414
- Vehicle registration: UP-66

Deegh is a town and a Block (Mandal) in Bhadohi district in the Indian state of Uttar Pradesh.

== Villages under Deegh Block ==
List of villages in Deegh Block

1. Amilaur Tari
2. Amilaur Uparwar
3. Arai Tari N. Baripur
4. Arai Uparwar N. Baripur
5. Arata
6. Arazi Chhatami
7. Atibalshah Tari
8. Atibalshah Uparwar
9. Awapur
10. Badaripur Tari
11. Badaripur Uparwar
12. Badhamana
13. Bahapura Tari
14. Bahupura Uparwar
15. Baikunth Patti Urf Dhanapur
16. Bainkunth Patti Urf Sujatpur
17. Bairaja
18. Balanpur
19. Balipur N.Baragaon
20. Banaka Tari
21. Bankar Tari N. Baripur
22. Bankat Khas
23. Bankat N.Koirauna
24. Bankat Uparwar N. Barpur
25. Baragaon
26. Baraipur
27. Baripur Tari
28. Baripuruparwar
29. Belhua
30. Beraspur Tari
31. Berwa Paharpur Tari
32. Berwa Paharpur Uparwar
33. Bhabhauri Tari
34. bhabhauri Uparwar
35. Bhagwanpur Chauthar
36. Bharatpur Baragaon
37. Bhatgavan Tari
38. Bhatgavan Uparwar
39. Bhavapur N. Baragaon
40. Bhikhipur N. Koirauna
41. Bhuri Uparwar
42. Bhurra Tari
43. Bichhiya
44. Biharojpur Tari
45. Biharojpur Uparwar
46. Birnai
47. Bitthalpur
48. Chain Patti
49. Chak Bahattar
50. Chak Harnandan
51. Chak Jujhari
52. Chak Mandhata (Hardevpur)
53. Chak Musaha
54. Chak Premgiri
55. Chak Vijai N. Padauna
56. Chakdadu N. Padauna
57. Chakia Tari
58. Chakia Uparwar
59. Chaksada
60. Chandapur
61. Chatur Seva
62. Chhatmi Khas
63. Chhechhua Tari
64. Chhechhua Uparwar
65. Danipatti Tari
66. Danipatti Uparwar
67. Darwasi
68. Dasharam Patti
69. Deegh Tari
70. Deeghuparwar
71. Dhan Tulsi Tari
72. Dhan Tulsi Uparwar
73. Dhanai Patti
74. Dhara Visambhar Patti
75. Dodil Patti
76. Duguna Tari
77. Duguna Uparwar
78. Fulwariya Uparwar
79. Fulwariyatari
80. Gajadharpur Tari N. Ojhapur
81. Gajadharpur Uparwar
82. Gajadharpur Uparwar N. Ojhapur
83. Gambhir Singh Patti
84. Gandhi
85. Ganga Patti
86. Ghana Patti
87. Ghanshyampur
88. Godhana
89. Golekkhara
90. Gopalpur Tari
91. Gopalpur Tari
92. Gopalpur Uparwar
93. Gopalpur Uparwar
94. Gopi Patti
95. Gulauri Tari
96. Gulauri Uparwar
97. Hari Rampur Tari
98. Hari Rampur Uparwar
99. Ibrahimpur
100. Ibrahimpur Uparwar
101. Inargaon
102. Itahara Tari
103. Itahara Uparwar
104. Jaganandan Patti
105. Jagapur
106. Jagdishpur Tari
107. Jagdishpur Uparwar
108. Jagdishpur Urf Chhatami
109. Jagdishpur Urf Kanthi Patti
110. Jajpur
111. Jangalpur
112. Jodhi Patti
113. Jogapur
114. Judaupor N.Suryabhanpur
115. Kalaka Pura
116. Kalanua
117. Kalik Mavaiya Tari
118. Kalik Mavaiya Uparwar
119. Kalika Nagar Koirauna
120. Kalinjar Tari
121. Kalinjara Uparwar
122. Kanchanpur
123. Kanthi Patti
124. Karbadhiya Tari
125. Karvghiya Uparwar
126. Kaulapur
127. Kedarpur Tari
128. Kedarpur Uparwar
129. Keshorampur
130. Kewatahi
131. Khanapur
132. Khargapur
133. Khedopur N. Koirauna
134. Khemapur N. Diha Tari
135. Khemapur N. Dihuparwar
136. Khorabeer
137. Kishun Deopur
138. Kormaich
139. Kulmanpur
140. Kundi Kala Tari
141. Kundi Kala Uparwar
142. Kundi Khurd Tari
143. Kundi Khurd Uparwar
144. Kurwauparwar
145. Kuthawatari
146. Lakhanpur Bhadran Uparwar
147. Lakhanpur Bhadraun Tari
148. Madanpur
149. Madhopur N. Dhonapur
150. Mahmadpur Tari
151. Mahmadpur Uparwar
152. Mahuari
153. Mailauna
154. Majhagawan
155. Manga Patti
156. Manshahpur
157. Marhachh Tari
158. Marhachh Uparwar
159. Marsara
160. Matukpur
161. Mavaiya Than Singh Tari
162. Mavaiya Vara Goti Tari
163. Mavaiya Vara Goti Uparwar
164. Mavaiyat Wansingh Uparwar
165. N. Itahara Gajadharpur Tari
166. Nabhapur
167. Nagardah Tari
168. Nagardah Uparwar
169. Nanepar Tari
170. Narepar Uparwar
171. Naudhan
172. Neknam Patti
173. Ojhapur
174. Parasani Tari
175. Parasrampur Baragaon
176. Parsani Uparwar
177. Peraspur Uparwar
178. Poore Nagari
179. Poore Purwa Tari
180. Poore Purwa Uparwar
181. Pratap Shahpur
182. Prayagdaspur
183. Purwa Tari
184. Purwa Uparwar
185. Raipatti N. Suryabhanpur
186. Raiyapur
187. Rajmala
188. Ramdaspur
189. Ramkishunpur Basahi
190. Rasapatti
191. Sadashiv Patti
192. Sagar Raipur
193. Sajhara Tari
194. Sanaka Uparwar
195. Sarai Jagadish
196. Saraiya
197. Semaradh Tari
198. Semradhh Uparwar
199. Sewak Patti
200. Sherpur Pindara Hissa Urf Joga
201. Sherpur Tari
202. Sherpur Uparwar
203. Sherpur Urf Lachhaman Patti
204. Sherpur Urf Vijalepur
205. Shivnath Patti
206. Shivpur N. Tilanga
207. Shivrampur
208. Shivrampur N. Tulsipur
209. Shivsewak Patti
210. Siki Chaura
211. Sonaicha
212. Sudhavai
213. Surajbhanpur
214. Suriya
215. Tateria
216. Terhi Tari
217. Terhi Uparwar
218. Tikari
219. Tilanga
220. Tribhuvan Baragaon
221. Tribhuwanpur N.Koirauna
222. Tulapur Rohi
223. Tulsi Kala Tari
224. Tulsi Kala Uparwar
225. Tulsi Patti
226. Tulsipur
227. Ullanpur
228. Uzmugaraha
229. Vairi Veesa
230. Vaja Patti
231. Vedmanpur
232. Vidan Patti
233. Vihaspur
234. Dhara Visambhar Patti
