= Mirzapur district =

District in Uttar Pradesh, India

Coordinates: 25.150677°N 82.564807°E

- District of Uttar Pradesh
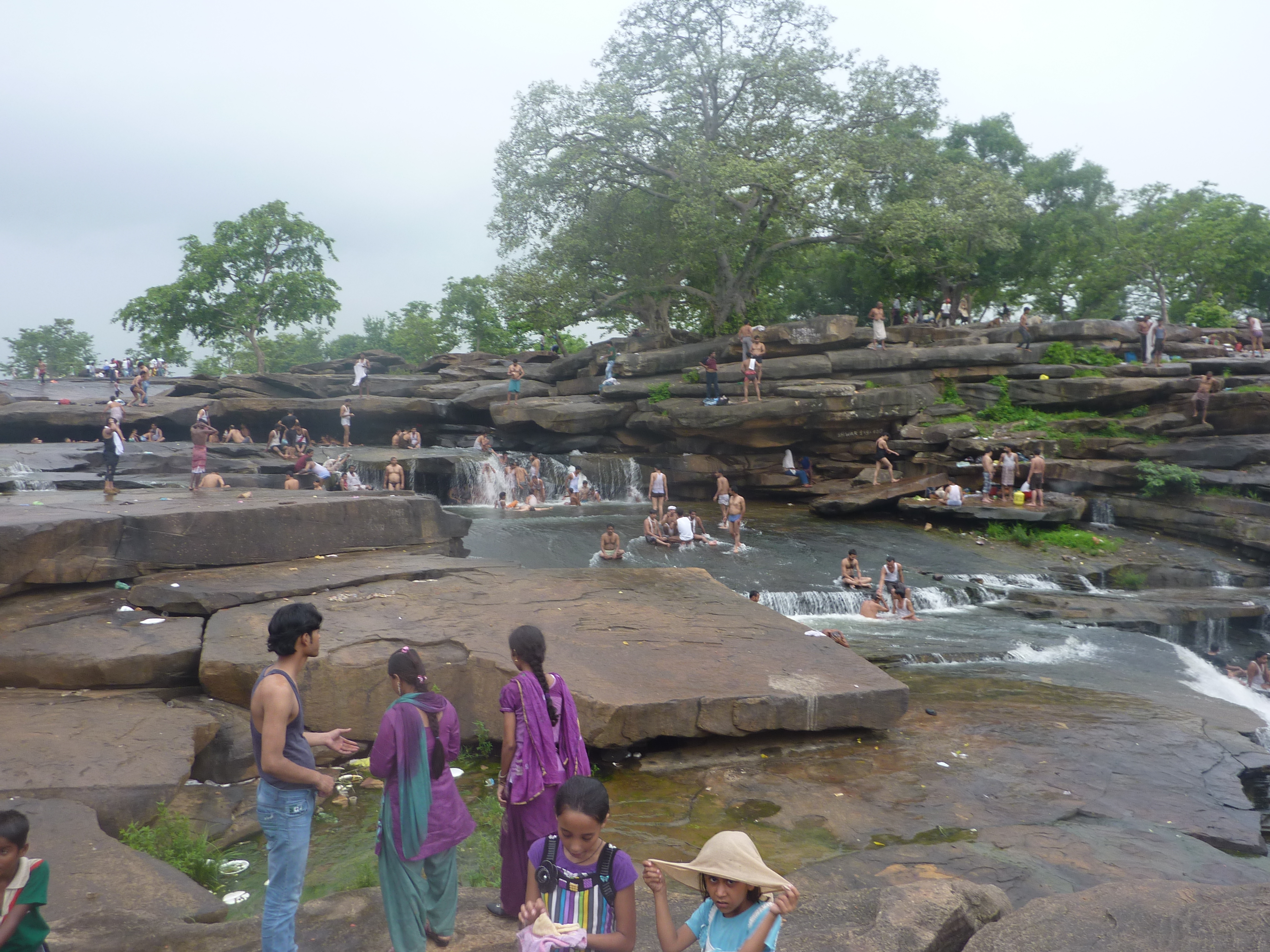
- Siddhanath ki Dari Falls

- Location of Mirzapur district in Uttar Pradesh
- Country: India
- State: Uttar Pradesh
- Division: Mirzapur
- Established: 1509
- Headquarters: Mirzapur
- Tehsils: 4

Government
  - District Magistrate: Shri Pawan Kumar Gangwar, IAS
  - Chairman, Nagar Palika Parishad, Mirzapur: Shyam Sunder Keshari
  - Lok Sabha constituencies: Mirzapur
  - Member of Parliament, Lok Sabha: Anupriya Patel (Minister of State for Commerce and Industry of India)

Area
  - Total: 4,521 km^{2} (1,746 sq mi)

Population (2011)
  - Total: 2,496,970
  - Density: 552.3/km^{2} (1,430/sq mi)
  - Urban: 347,567

Demographics
  - Literacy: 70.38%
  - Sex ratio: 903
  - Language: Hindi • Awadhi • Bhojpuri
- Time zone: UTC+05:30 (IST)
- Vehicle registration: UP-63
- Average annual precipitation: 1043 mm
- Website: Official Website

Mirzapur district is one of the 75 districts in the Indian state of Uttar Pradesh. The district is bounded on the north by Bhadohi and Varanasi districts, on the east by Chandauli district, on the south by Sonbhadra district and Rewa district of Madhya Pradesh and on the northwest by Prayagraj. The district occupies an area of 4521 km^{2}. Mirzapur city is the district headquarters. Mirzapur district is a part of Mirzapur division. This district is known for the Vindhyavasini temple in Vindhyachal and several tourist attractions like waterfalls like Rajdari and Devdari and dams. It consist of several Ghats where historical sculptures are still present. During the Ganges festival these Ghats are decorated with lights and earthen lamps.

It was once the largest district in Uttar Pradesh until Sonbhadra district was separated from Mirzapur in 1989.

== Demographics ==
Historical population
Year	Pop.	±% p.a.
1901	488,998	—
1911	483,880	−0.11%
1921	483,470	−0.01%
1931	526,344	+0.85%
1941	600,806	+1.33%
1951	679,171	+1.23%
1961	803,784	+1.70%
1971	960,495	+1.80%
1981	1,238,432	+2.57%
1991	1,627,970	+2.77%
2001	2,074,709	+2.45%
2011	2,496,970	+1.87%

Religions in Mirzapur district (2011)
Religion	Percent
Hinduism	91.81%
Islam	7.84%
Other or not stated	0.35%

According to the 2011 census Mirzapur district has a population of 2,496,970, roughly equal to the nation of Kuwait or the US state of Nevada. This gives it a ranking of 174th in India (out of a total of 640). The district has a population density of 561 inhabitants per square kilometre (1,450/sq mi). Its population growth rate over the decade 2001-2011 was 17.89%. Mirzapur has a sex ratio of 900 females for every 1000 males, and a literacy rate of 70.38%. 13.92% of the population lives in urban areas. Scheduled Castes and Scheduled Tribes made up 26.48% and 0.81% of the population respectively. Female literacy rate here is 54%.

== Languages ==
At the time of the 2011 Census of India, 80.95% of the population in the district reported Hindi as their mother tongue .

Languages of Mirzapur district (2011)
1. Hindi (81.0%)
2. Bhojpuri (18.4%)
3. Others (0.65%)

Hindi is the native language spoken in Mirzapur according to the historical estimates.

== Administrative divisions ==
The district consists four Tehsils. These are Mirzapur (Sadar), Chunar, Marihan and Lalganj. These four tehsils are further divided into twelve blocks.

== Etymology ==
The name Mirzapur is believed to have multiple interpretations. One local belief connects it to the Persian term Mirza, which combines Mir (often linked to "sea" or "commander" in Persian/Arabic) and za (birth or lineage), with Pur meaning town or place. This suggests it could mean "place of the prince" or "child of the ruler." Another interpretation ties the name to goddess Lakshmi, who emerged from the sea during the churning of the ocean (Samudra Manthan) in Hindu mythology, linking "Mir" to the sea and "ja" to outcome. Additionally, folklore suggests the town was originally called Girijapur (Town of Mountains), possibly founded by Raja Nanner, before evolving into Mirzapur during Mughal times, likely under Shah Jahan’s reign.

== History ==
Mirzapur was founded by Raja Nanner. It was formerly known as Girjapur named after Goddess Girija ( Parvati ). Current Nomenclature of Mirzapur is derived from the conjunction of the Terms Mir, Ja and Pur meaning Sea, Outcome and Town respectively.

== Economy ==
In 2006 the Ministry of Panchayati Raj named Mirzapur one of the country's 250 most backward districts (out of a total of 640). It is one of the 34 districts in Uttar Pradesh to have received funds from the Backward Regions Grant Fund Programme (BRGF). Once tourism used to contribute to the economy but due to lack of care from government officials and local people the unmatched beauty of the places like Sirshe dam and waterfall, Dadri (Pipari) dam, Vindham waterfall, Lower Khajuri, Upper Khajuri, Lakhaniya waterfall, Siddhnath Waterfall, Kotwan-Patehara forest, Fort of Chunar and Dadri-Haliya forest has become 'the stories of past'. Once there was a time when every Sunday of rainy season used to be a fair like atmosphere for the neighbouring localities of Sirshe waterfall and Vindham waterfall due to their attraction of tourist not only from every part of the U.P. and but neighbourhood states too. The separation of the Sonebhadra largely affected the economical condition and after the closing of mills and depression in the carpet industry Mirzapur has become economically disadvantaged.

== Education ==
=== Colleges ===
- K.B. Postgraduate College
- G.D. Binani P.G. College
- Maa Vindhyavasini Autonomous State Medical College
- Rajiv Gandhi South Campus, BHU
- B.L.J. Inter College
- M.P.M.B. Inter College
- Government Inter College
- Jubilee Inter College
- Arya Kanya Inter College

== Notable people ==
- Sone Lal Patel, Indian politician.
- Anupriya Patel, Indian politician.
- Amar Goswami, senior journalist and one of the prominent fiction writers of Hindi literature
- Naheed Abidi, Indian scholar of Sanskrit
- Lakshmi Raj Sharma, Indian author, novelist, and academic
- Lalita Shastri, wife of former Prime Minister of India Lal Bahadur Shastri
- Prachi Mishra, Femina Miss India Earth 2012
- Pawan Jaiswal, Indian journalist (1988–2022)
