= Bhadohi district =

District in Uttar Pradesh, India

Coordinates: 25°20′24″N 82°28′12″E

- District of Uttar Pradesh
- Bhadohi
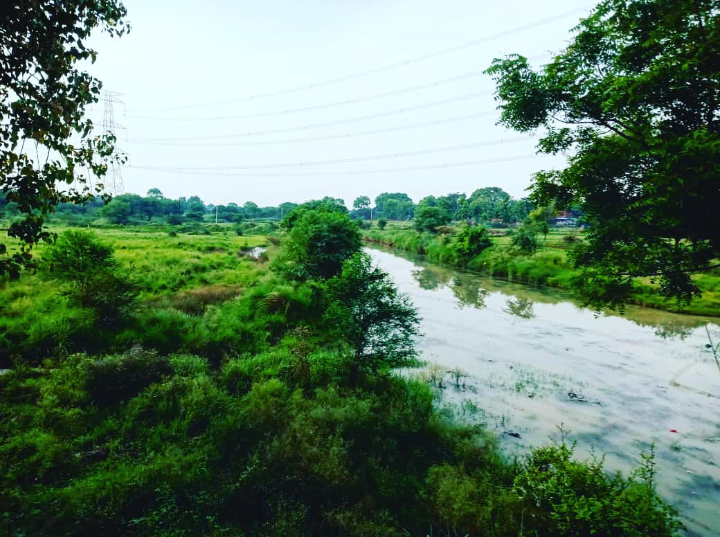
- A view of Morva River in Moosilatpur village
- Nickname: Carpet City of India
- Country: India
- State: Uttar Pradesh
- Division: Mirzapur
- Established: 30 June 1994
- Headquarters: Bhadohi
- Tehsils: 3

Government
  - District Magistrate: Shailesh Kumar, IAS
  - Lok Sabha constituencies: Bhadohi
  - Member of Parliament, Lok Sabha: Vinod Kumar Bind

Area
  - Total: 1,015 km^{2} (392 sq mi)

Population (2011)
  - Total: 1,578,213
  - Density: 1,555/km^{2} (4,027/sq mi)

Language
  - Official: Hindi
  - Regional: Awadhi

Demographics
  - Literacy: 89.14%
  - Sex ratio: 902
- Time zone: UTC+05:30 (IST)
- Vehicle registration: UP-66
- Major highways: NH 2; NH 135A; NH 731B
- Website: Official Website

Bhadohi district is a district of Uttar Pradesh state in northern India. It is also referred to as Sant Ravidas Nagar. It is the smallest district by area in the state of Uttar Pradesh which was created on June 30, 1994 by dividing western part of the district Varanasi. It is surrounded by Varanasi district on east, Prayagraj district on west, Jaunpur north and Mirzapur district in south. The state capital Lucknow is distanced at 234 KM from Bhadohi. Its district headquarters is situated in the city of Gyanpur. The district is popularly known for carpet weaving as it is one of largest centres of Carpet Industries in India and therefore it also known as the 'Carpet City of India'. Carpets of Bhadohi have 'Geographical Indication' tag attached to it. Bhadohi has huge geographical significance and position attached to it due to its location between two culturally important and rich heritage cities of Prayagraj and Varanasi.

== History ==
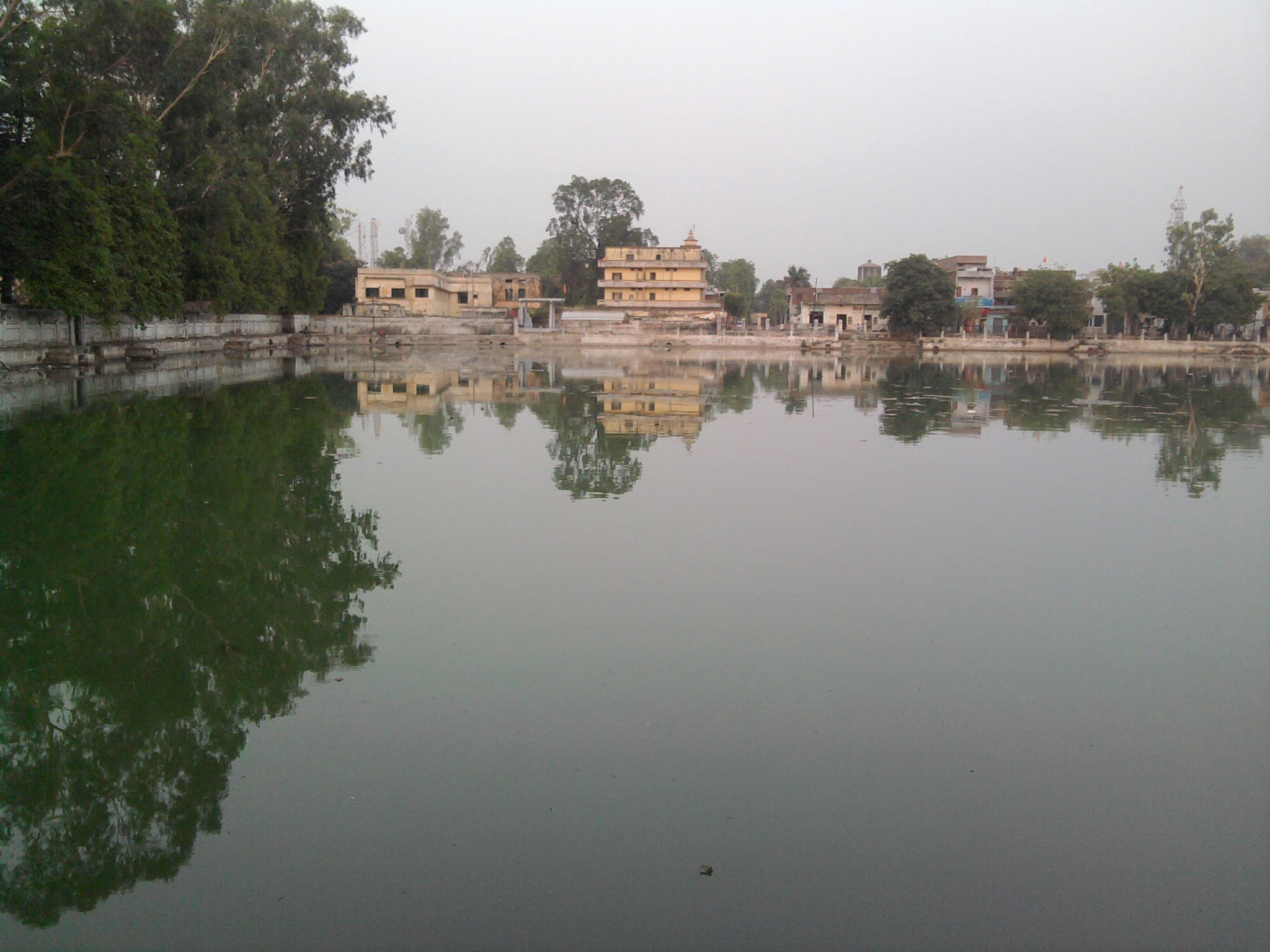
Hariharnath Mandir, Gyanpur

=== Ancient period ===
According to the epic Mahābhārata, the Pandavas escaped from Lakshagrah through a tunnel and took shelter here at a place called Semradhnath. It is also believed that Mata Sita, wife of Lord Rama, lived here in the ashram of Maharshi Valmiki when she was abandoned by Lord Rama, and also that Lav and Kush the twin sons of Lord Rama were born in this ashram only. Once, followed by fake accuses of public and Lord Rama's request to prove her purity once again Mata Sita in grief immersed herself in the lap of goddess Earth.

=== Medieval period ===
Bhadohi supposedly gets its name from Bhar Raj of the region which had Bhadohi as its capital, whose traces can be found in the names of ruined mounds and old tanks named after the Bhar rulers, a tributary of Kannauj kingdom, which in the early medieval period was included in the Kingdom of Jaunpur.

During the reign of Mughal Emperor Akbar, Bhadohi was made a dastur and included in the sarkar of Allahabad.

By the fifteenth century the Bhar were overpowered by Monas Rajputs with Sagar Rai as the first head of the clan, and his grandson, Jodh Rai received it as a zamindari sanad (deed) from Mughal Emperor Shah-e-Jahan.

However around 1750 AD due to non-payment of land revenue arrears, Raja Pratap Singh of Pratapgarh, in lieu of his paying the arrears gave the entire pargana to Balwant Singh of Benaras, subsequently he received it directly under a sanad from Nawab Shuja-ud-Daula of Awadh under British influence in 1770 AD.

In 1911, Bhadohi came under first Maharaja of the newly created princely state of Benares ruled by Maharaja Prabhu Narayan Singh and it remained with Benaras till 1947.

=== Saint Ravidas ===
Sant Ravi Das, known as Raidas also, was one of the twelve pupils of Saint Ramanand. The devotee of 'Nirgun Brahama'. Raidas never discriminated between Hindus and Muslims. He established the 'Raidasi Sampradaya'. The region is also linked with Sant Ravidas, after whom the district has been given the name Sant Ravidas Nagar (Bhadohi).

=== Modern period ===
Bhadohi was created on 30 June 1994 as the 65th district of the State. It was part of Varanasi district prior to its creation.

The Mayawati government changed this district's name from Bhadohi to Sant Ravidas Nagar (S.R.N.). The Akhilesh Yadav government resolved on 6 December 2014 to change the name back to Bhadohi.

== Geography ==
This district is situated in the plains of the Ganges River, which forms the southwestern border of the district. Ganges, Varuna and Morva are the main rivers. The district is surrounded by Jaunpur district to the north, Varanasi district to the east, Mirzapur district to the south, and Prayagraj district to the west. With an area of 1055.99 km² Bhadohi is the smallest district of Uttar Pradesh area wise. Bhoganw and Rampur are famous ghats in Bhadohi, and also there are many divine temples in Bhadohi, namely: Sita Samahit Sthal (Sitamarhi), Semradhnath Mahadev Dham, Baba Harihar Nath Mandir, Baba Doodhnath Mandir, Ghopaila Devi Mandir (Gyanpur), Chakwa Mahaveer Hanuman Mandir, Baba Bade Shiv Mandir (Gopiganj), Bhadreshwar Mahadev Mandir, Maa Kamakhya Dham (Uchetha Village), Baba Pandwa Nath Mandir (Kaulapur), Sankat Mochan Hanuman Mandir vikaiyadham "Sankat Mochan Maruti Trust Chakshridatt VikaiyaDham (Chakshridatt Tiwaripur), Shiv Mandir (Sundarpur), ShreeRam Mandir (Kaulapur), Shani Dham, Baba Tileshwarnath Mandir (Tilanga village), Bhadrakali temple, and Baba Gangeshwarnath Dham (Itahara Uparwar Village) Khorabeer Maharaj(Bhagavanpur) Baba KabutarNath Mandir Gopiganj Anjahi Mohal.

== Demographics ==
Historical population
Year	Pop.	±% p.a.
1901	252,866	—
1911	254,175	+0.05%
1921	258,180	+0.16%
1931	276,399	+0.68%
1941	327,907	+1.72%
1951	388,471	+1.71%
1961	464,317	+1.80%
1971	557,307	+1.84%
1981	780,014	+3.42%
1991	1,077,633	+3.28%
2001	1,353,705	+2.31%
2011	1,578,213	+1.55%

Religion in Bhadohi district (2011)
Religion	Percent
Hinduism	86.70%
Islam	12.92%
Other or not stated	0.38%

According to the 2011 census Bhadohi district had a population of 1,578,213, roughly equal to the nation of Gabon or the US state of Hawaii. This gives it a ranking of 320th in India (out of a total of 640). The district has a population density of 1,531 inhabitants per square kilometre (3,970/sq mi). Its population growth rate over the decade 2001-2011 was 14.81%. Bhadohi has a sex ratio of 950 females for every 1000 males, and a literacy rate of 89.14%. 14.53% of the population lives in urban areas. Scheduled Castes made up 22.37% of the population.

=== Languages ===
Languages in Bhadohi district (2011)
1. Hindi (66.4%)
2. Awadhi (25.0%)
3. Bhojpuri (6.34%)
4. Urdu (2.17%)
5. Others (0.10%)

At the time of the 2011 Census of India, 66.38

Tehsil	Hindi	Awadhi	Bhojpuri	Urdu
Bhadohi	70.52%	14.26%	10.29%	4.79%
Gyanpur	73.50%	20.83%	4.99%	0.58%
Aurai	49.32%	13.92%	3.9%	0.82%

== Governance and politics ==
=== Divisions ===
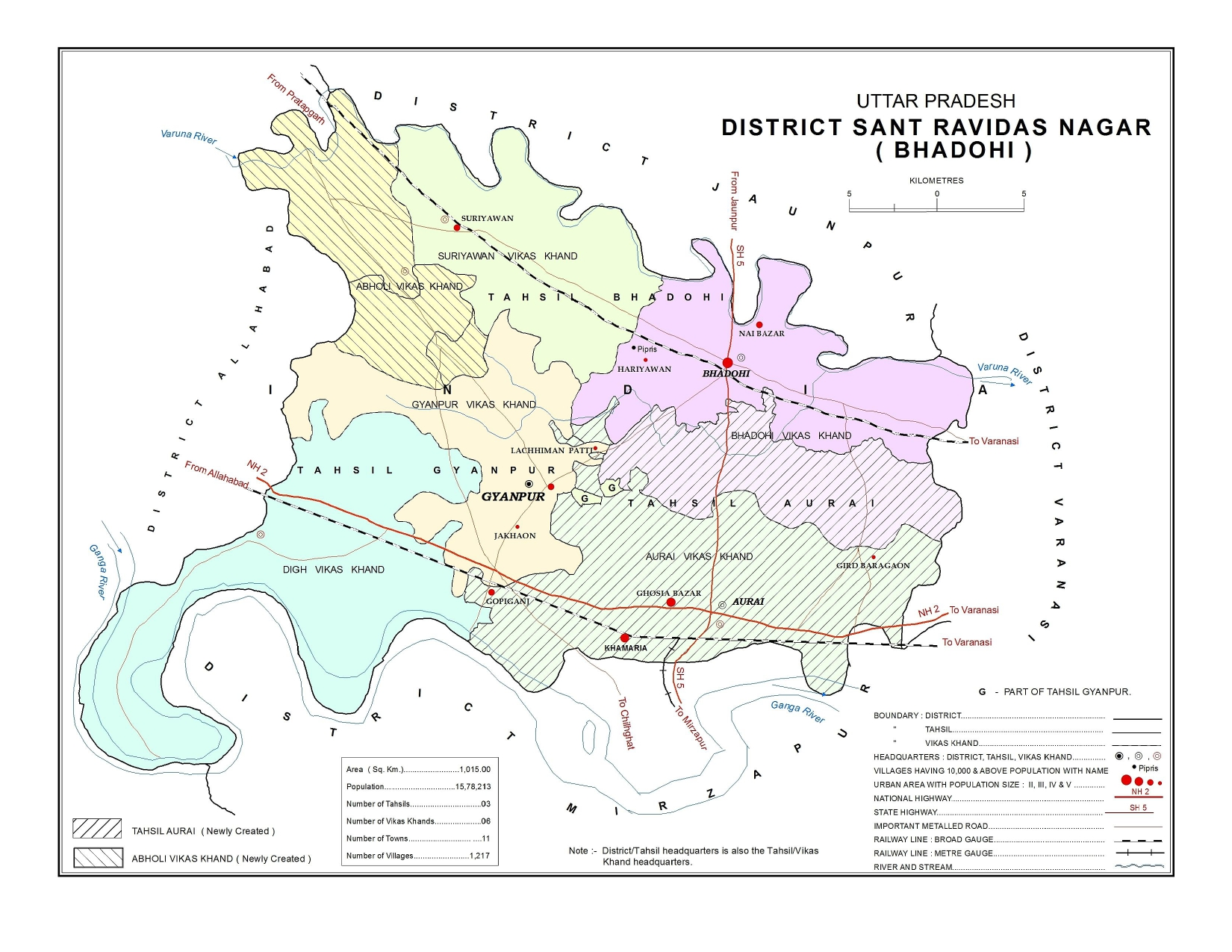
2011 Indian Census Disional Map of District Bhadohi

This district is divided into three tehsils, Aurai Tehsil, Bhadohi and Gyanpur, and six blocks, Bhadohi, Suriyawan, Gyanpur, Deegh, Abholi and Aurai.

There are 1075 populated villages and 148 non-populated villages, along with 79 nyay-panchayat and 489 gram panchayats in the district. The district has nine geographically divided police stations namely - Aurai, Bhadohi, Chauri, Durgaganj, Gopiganj, Koirauna, Gyanpur, Oonj and Suriyawan In urban area there are seven statutory Towns and four Census Town. Statutory Towns are two Nagar Palika Parishad and five Nagar Panchayats.

== Economy ==
=== Bhadohi carpets ===
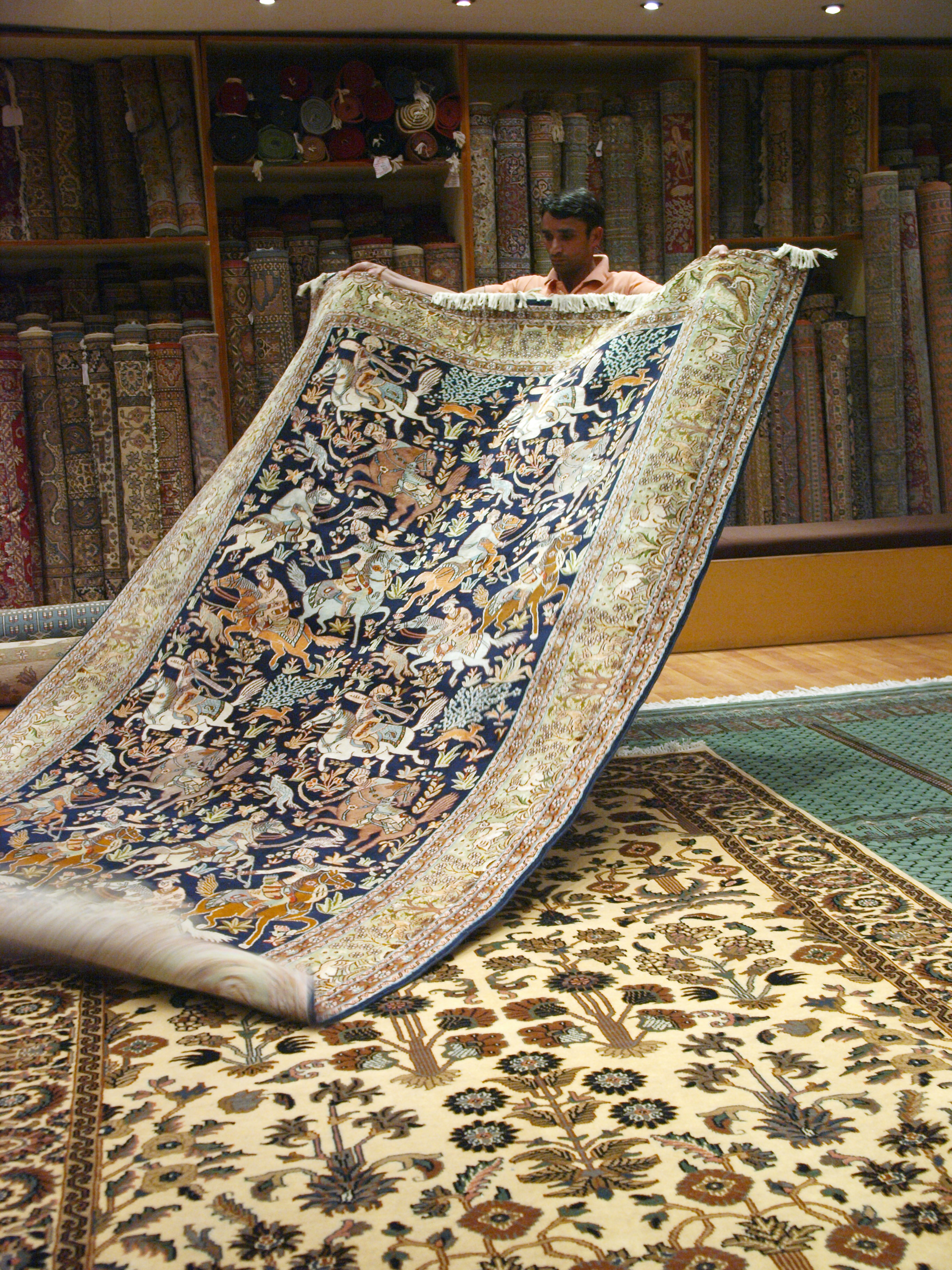
A carpet seller in Gopiganj, Bhadohi, India

Carpet weaving in Bhadohi-Mirzapur region dates back to the 16th century, during the reign of Mughal Emperor, Akbar and is believed to have established when centuries ago, some Iranian master weavers stopped at Madhosingh village, near Khamaria, in Bhadohi while travelling in India, and subsequently set up looms here.

The present day Bhadohi district is biggest carpet manufacturing centres in India, most known for its hand-knotted carpet. While the Mirzapur-Bhadohi region has the largest number of weavers involved in handmade carpet weaving cluster, engaging around 3.2 million people in the industry, Bhadohi alone employs 2.2 million rural artisans in its 100 percent export-oriented industry. Bhadohi based organisations account for about 75% of the Rs 44 billion of total carpet exports from India, The annual turnover of carpet exports from Bhadohi was Rs 25 billion (approx) in 2010.

In 2010, the carpets of the region received the Geographical Indication (GI) tag, which means carpets manufactured in nine districts of the region, Bhadohi, Mirzapur, Varanasi, Ghazipur, Sonebhadra, Kaushambi, Allahabad, Jaunpur and Chandauli would be tagged with 'handmade carpet of Bhadohi'. Most of the production is aimed at foreign countries.

Well-known carpet types from Bhadohi include cotton Dhurries, Chhapra Mir carpets, Abusan, Persian, Loribaft, Indo Gabbeh but also Nepalese carpets and more recent shaggy type carpets. They are manufactured in various qualities.

Bhadohi received a major boost in November 2018 as the government has extended the 'export excellence' tag to it. Under the 'Towns of Export Excellence' tag, carpet makers of the city will get financial assistance from the central government to procure modern machines, improve export infrastructure, and organise fairs and exhibitions in different parts of the world to attract global buyers. Bhadohi will be the 37th town in India to get this status. The tag would help put the carpet city on the world map.

== Notable people ==
- Rinku Singh Rajput- Wrestler (WWE)
- Shivam Dube - Cricketer
- Yashashvi Jaiswal - Cricketer
- Rangnath Mishra- Politician
- Jameel Khan - Actor
- Ramyatna Shukla- Scholar
- Kapil Deva Dvivedi- Scholar
- Shyamdhar Mishra - Politician
