= Bhadohi =

City in Uttar Pradesh, India

- City
- Location in Uttar Pradesh, India Bhadohi (India)
- Coordinates: 25.42°N 82.57°E
- Country: India
- State: Uttar Pradesh
- District: Bhadohi
- Established: 30 June 1994

Government
  - Type: Municipality
  - Body: Bhadohi Nagar Palika
- Elevation: 85 m (279 ft)

Population (2011)
  - Total: 94,620

Language
  - Official: Hindi
  - Additional official: Urdu
  - Regional: Bhojpuri
- Time zone: UTC+05:30 (IST)
- PIN: 221401
- Vehicle registration: UP-66
- Website: Official Website

Bhadohi is a city and municipal corporation in the Bhadohi district of northern Indian state of Uttar Pradesh. As the district headquarters of Bhadohi, it is home to the largest hand-knotted carpet-weaving industry hub in South Asia. The city has a long-standing tradition of weaving carpets which are known for their durability, unique patterns and craftsmanship. Bhadohi has geographical significance due to its location between two culturally important and rich heritage cities of Prayagraj and Varanasi.

The city is 45 km west of Varanasi, and 82 km east of Prayagraj.

== Demographics ==
Religion in Bhadohi (2011)
| Religion | Percent |
| Hinduism | 82.33% |
| Islam | 17.07% |
| Other or not stated | 0.60% |

As of 2011 Indian Census, Bhadohi had a total population of 94,620, of which 49,639 were males and 44,981 were females. Population within the age group of 0 to 6 years was 14,083. The total number of literates in Bhadohi was 58,470, which constituted 61.8% of the population with male literacy of 68.0% and female literacy of 54.9%. The effective literacy rate of 7+ population of Bhadohi was 72.6%, of which male literacy rate was 79.8% and female literacy rate was 64.6%. The Scheduled Castes and Scheduled Tribes population was 9,597 and 15 respectively. Bhadohi had 13274 households in 2011.

== Commerce ==
The main business in Bhadohi is carpet manufacturing. Bhadohi employs 22 lakh artisans in its carpet industry. The Bhadohi carpets are known for their durability, softness and unique designs, which incorporate a blend of traditional and modern patterns. The Bhadohi carpets are exported to various countries worldwide, including the United States, United Kingdom and Germany among others.

== Education ==
The Indian Institute of Carpet Technology, the only institute of its kind in Asia, was established by Ministry of Textiles, Government of India, in 2001. It has been recognized by the All India Council for Technical Education and is affiliated with Joint Seat Allocation Authority (JOSAA).The institute offers a Bachelor of Technology (B.Tech) in Carpet and Textile Technology (CTT). The syllabus of the programmes covers both practical as well as theoretical understanding of the process of dyeing, textile fibres, carpet washing, and other industrial techniques.

== Notable people ==
- Yashasvi Jaiswal, is a cricketer in the Indian national team, who scored a test-hundred against West Indies in his debut innings. The next year, he hit two double centuries against England.
- Shivam Dube, is cricketer in the Indian national team as an all-rounder. Dube was a member of the Indian team that won the 2024 and 2026 Men's T20 World Cup.
