= Bhopal–Dhanbad Express =

Train in India

Bhopal - Dhanbad Express
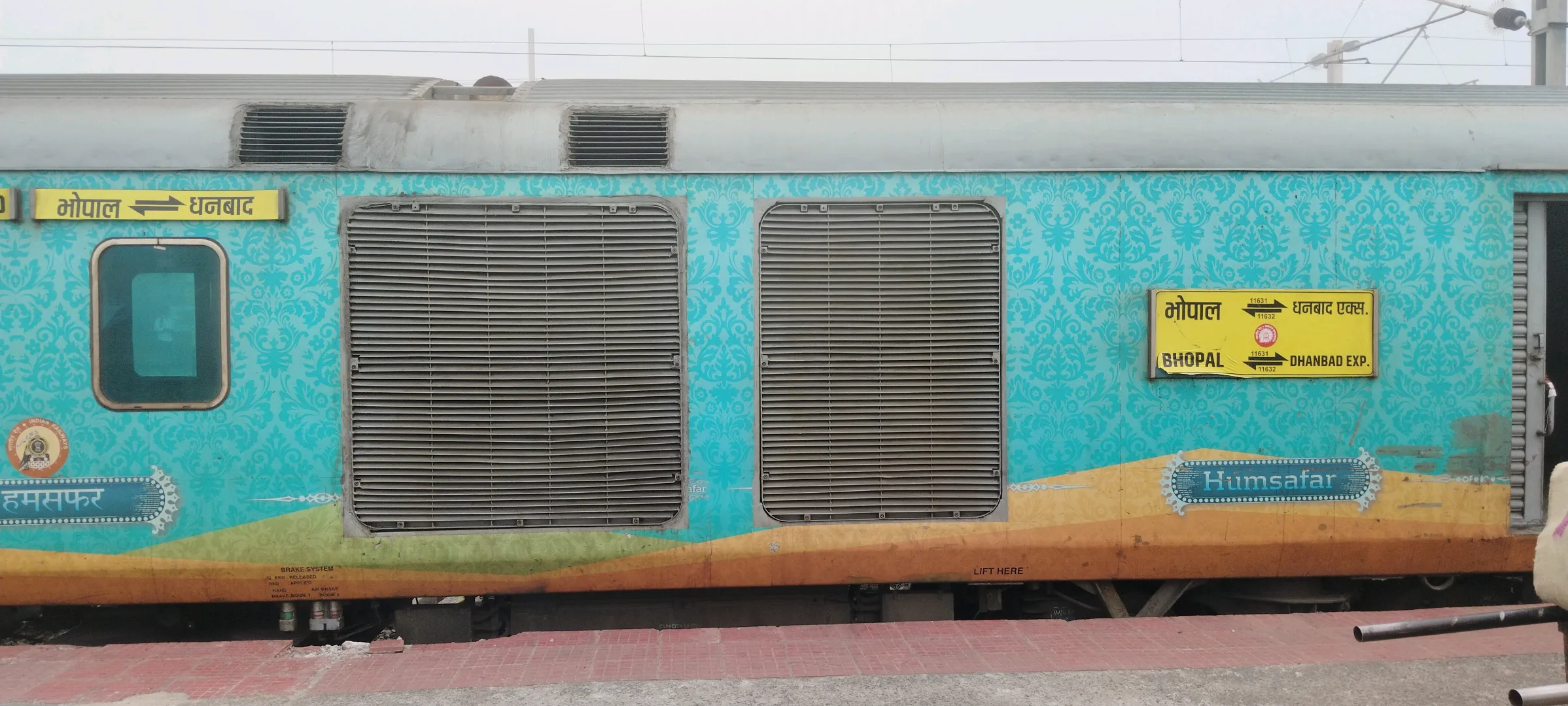
- 11632 Dhanbad - Bhopal standing at Dhanbad Junction

Overview
- Service type: Express
- Status: Active
- Locale: Madhya Pradesh, Uttar Pradesh and Jharkhand
- First service: 27 February 2026; 3 months ago
- Current operator: West Central (WC)

Route
- Termini: Bhopal Junction (BPL); Dhanbad Junction (DHN)
- Stops: 32
- Distance travelled: 1,195 km (743 mi)
- Average journey time: 23h 25m
- Service frequency: Tri Weekly
- Train number: 11631 / 11632

On-board services
- Classes: General Unreserved, Sleeper Class, AC 1st Class, AC 2nd Class, AC 3rd Class
- Seating arrangements: Yes
- Sleeping arrangements: Yes
- Catering facilities: Pantry Car
- Observation facilities: Large windows
- Baggage facilities: No
- Other facilities: Below the seats

Technical
- Rolling stock: LHB coach
- Track gauge: 1,676 mm (5 ft 6 in)
- Electrification: 25 kV 50 Hz AC Overhead line
- Operating speed: 130 km/h (81 mph) maximum, 51 km/h (32 mph) average including halts.
- Track owner: Indian Railways

The 11631 / 11632 Bhopal–Dhanbad Express is an express train belonging to West Central Railway zone that runs between the city Bhopal Junction of Madhya Pradesh and Dhanbad Junction of Jharkhand in India.

It operates as train number 11631 from Bhopal Junction to Dhanbad Junction and as train number 11632 in the reverse direction, serving the states of Madhya Pradesh, Uttar Pradesh and Jharkhand.

== Services ==
- 11631/ Bhopal–Dhanbad Express has an average speed of 51 km/h and covers 1195 km in 23h 25m.
- 11632/ Dhanbad–Bhopal Express has an average speed of 50 km/h and covers 1195 km in 23h 40m.

== Routes and halts ==
The important halts of the train are :

- Bhopal Junction
- Vidisha
- Ganj Bosada
- Bina Junction
- Saugor
- Damoh
- Katni Murwara Junction
- Khanna Banjari
- Beohari
- Marwas Gram
- Sarai Gram
- Bargawan
- Singraulli
- Karaila Road Junction
- Mirchadhuri
- Obra Dam
- Chopan
- Renukoot
- Nagar Untari
- Garhwa
- Garhwa Road Junction
- Daltonganj
- Barwadih Junction
- Latehar
- Tori Junction
- Khalari
- Patratu
- Ranchi Road
- Bokaro Thermal
- Chandrapura Junction
- Katrasgarh
- Dhanbad Junction

== Schedule ==
- 11631 - 8:55 PM (Monday, Thursday & Friday) [Bhopal Junction]
- 11632 - 7:20 AM (Sunday, Wednesday & Saturday) [Dhanbad Junction]

== Coach composition ==
1. General Unreserved - 4
2. Sleeper Class - 7
3. AC 3rd Class - 6
4. AC 2nd Class - 2
5. AC 1st Class - 1

== Traction ==
As the entire route is fully electrified it is hauled by a Itarsi Loco Shed-based WAP-7 electric locomotive from Bhopal Junction to Dhanbad Junction and vice versa.

== Rake reversal or rake share ==
The train will reverse 1 time :

1. Chopan

The train will rake sharing with Bhopal - Singrauli Urjadhani Superfast Express, (22165/22166), Singrauli - Hazrat Nizamuddin Urjadhani Superfast Express (22167/22168), Bhopal–Chopan Weekly Express (11633/11634).

== See also ==
Trains from Bhopal Junction :

1. Shaan-e-Bhopal Express
2. Bhopal–Jaipur Express
3. Bhopal–Khajuraho Mahamana Superfast Express
4. Howrah–Bhopal Weekly Express
5. Bhopal–Indore AC Double Decker Express

Trains from Dhanbad Junction :

1. Dhanbad–Alappuzha Express
2. CSMT Kolhapur-Dhanbad Weekly Express
3. Dhanbad–Patna Intercity Express
4. Dhanbad–Gaya Intercity Express
5. Coalfield Express

== Notes ==
a. Runs 3 day in a week with both directions.
