= Bhopal–Chopan Weekly Express =

Train in India

Bhopal - Chopan Express

Overview
- Service type: Express
- Status: Active
- Locale: Madhya Pradesh and Uttar Pradesh
- First service: 1 March 2026; 5 months ago
- Current operator: West Central (WC)

Route
- Termini: Bhopal Junction (BPL); Chopan (CPU)
- Stops: 17
- Distance travelled: 723 km (449 mi)
- Average journey time: 13h 55m
- Service frequency: Weekly
- Train number: 11633 / 11634

On-board services
- Classes: General Unreserved, Sleeper Class, AC 1st Class, AC 2nd Class, AC 3rd Class
- Seating arrangements: Yes
- Sleeping arrangements: Yes
- Catering facilities: Pantry Car
- Observation facilities: Large windows
- Baggage facilities: No
- Other facilities: Below the seats

Technical
- Rolling stock: LHB coach
- Track gauge: 1,676 mm (5 ft 6 in)
- Electrification: 25 kV 50 Hz AC Overhead line
- Operating speed: 130 km/h (81 mph) maximum, 52 km/h (32 mph) average including halts.
- Track owner: Indian Railways

The 11633 / 11634 Bhopal–Chopan Weekly Express is an express train belonging to West Central Railway zone that runs between the city Bhopal Junction of Madhya Pradesh and Chopan of Uttar Pradesh in India.

It operates as train number 11633 from Bhopal Junction to Chopan and as train number 11634 in the reverse direction, serving the states of Madhya Pradesh and Uttar Pradesh.

== Services ==
- 11633/ Bhopal–Chopan Weekly Express has an average speed of 52 km/h and covers 723 km in 13h 55m.
- 11634/ Chopan–Bhopal Weekly Express has an average speed of 52 km/h and covers 723 km in 13h 50m.

== Route and halts ==
The important halts of the train are :

- Bhopal Junction
- Vidisha
- Ganj Basoda
- Bina Junction
- Saugor
- Damoh
- Katni Murwara Junction
- Khanna Banjari
- Beohari
- Marwas Gram
- Sarai Gram
- Bargawan
- Singrauli
- Karaila Road Junction
- Mirchadhuri
- Obra Dam
- Chopan

== Schedule ==
• 11633 - 8:55 PM (Sunday) [Bhopal Junction]

• 11634 - 5:10 PM (Monday) [Chopan]

== Coach composition ==
1. General Unreserved - 4
2. Sleeper Class - 7
3. AC 3rd Class - 6
4. AC 2nd Class - 2
5. AC 1st Class - 1

== Traction ==
As the entire route is fully electrified it is hauled by a Itarsi Loco Shed-based WAP-7 electric locomotive from Bhopal Junction to Chopan and vice versa.

== Rake share ==
The train will rake sharing with Bhopal–Dhanbad Express (11631/11632).

== See also ==
Trains from Bhopal Junction :

1. Bhopal–Pratapgarh Express (via Lucknow)
2. Howrah–Bhopal Weekly Express
3. Amarkantak Express
4. Bhopal–Bilaspur Express
5. Bhopal–Jaipur Express

Trains from Chopan :

1. Cholan Express
2. Ranchi–Chopan Express

== Notes ==
a. Runs a day in a week with both directions.
