= Bhopal–Singrauli Superfast Express =

Train in India

Bhopal–Singrauli Urjadhani Express

Overview
- Service type: Superfast
- First service: 15 August 2017; 8 years ago
- Current operator: West Central Railway

Route
- Termini: Bhopal (BPL); Singrauli (SGRL)
- Stops: 11
- Distance travelled: 673 km (418 mi)
- Average journey time: 12 hrs 10 mins
- Service frequency: Weekly (Note: Runs one day in a week for every direction.)
- Train number: 22165 / 22166

On-board services
- Classes: AC 2 Tier, AC 3 Tier, Sleeper Class, General Unreserved
- Seating arrangements: No
- Sleeping arrangements: Yes
- Catering facilities: On-board catering, E-catering
- Baggage facilities: No
- Other facilities: Below the seats

Technical
- Rolling stock: LHB coach
- Track gauge: 1,676 mm (5 ft 6 in)
- Operating speed: 56 km/h (35 mph) average including halts.
- Depot: Rani Kamalapati (RKMP)
- Rake maintenance: Rani Kamalapati (RKMP)
- Rake sharing: 22167/22168 Singrauli-Hazrat Nizamuddin Urjadhani Express; 11631/11632 Bhopal-Dhanbad Express; 11633/11634 Bhopal-Chopan Weekly Express

The 22165 / 22166 Bhopal–Singrauli Urjadhani Express is a superfast train belonging to West Central Railway zone that runs between Bhopal Junction and Singrauli in India. It is currently being operated with 22165/22166 train numbers on a weekly basis.

== Service ==
The 22165/Bhopal–Singrauli SF Express has an average speed of 56 km/h and covers 660 km in 11h 45m. The 22166/Singrauli–Bhopal SF Express has an average speed of 56 km/h and covers 660 km in 11h 45m.

== Route and halts ==
The important halts of the train are:

- Bhopal Junction
- Vidisha
- Ganj Basoda
- Bina Junction
- Saugor
- Damoh
- Katni Murwara
- Beohari
- Bargawan
- Singrauli

== Coach composition ==
The train has standard LHB rakes with max speed of 110 kmph. The train consists of 22 coaches:

- 1 First AC
- 2 AC II Tier
- 6 AC III Tier
- 7 Sleeper coaches
- 4 General Unreserved
- 1 Seating cum Luggage Rake
- 1 EOG

== Rake sharing ==
The train shares its rake with 22167/22168 Singrauli-Hazrat Nizamuddin Urjadhani Express, 11631/11632 Bhopal - Dhanbad Express & 11633/11634 Bhopal - Chopan Express

== Traction ==
It is hauled by an Itarsi Loco Shed based WAP-7 electric locomotive on its entire journey.
