= Agori Khas railway station =

Railway station in Uttar Pradesh, India

General information
- Location: Robertsganj/Sonbhadra City, Sonbhadra district, Uttar Pradesh; India
- Coordinates: 24.6832°N 83.0779°E
- Elevation: 318 metres (1,043 ft)
- Operator: North Central Railway

Construction
- Structure type: Standard (on-ground station)
- Parking: Yes

Other information
- Status: Functioning
- Station code: AGY
- Zone(s): North Central Railway
- Division(s): Allahabad
Location
- Location within India Location within Uttar Pradesh

Agori Khas railway station (station code AGY) is a small railway station located in Robertsganj, Sonbhadra district, Uttar Pradesh, India. It serves Robertsganj town.

== Major trains ==
- Shaktinagar Terminal–Bareilly Triveni Express

== See also ==
- Northern Railway zone
- Sonbhadra
