= Shaktinagar Terminal–Tanakpur Express =

Train in India

Shaktinagar Terminal-Tanakpur Triveni Express
Overview
- Service type: Express
- First service: 1 April 1970; 55 years ago
- Current operator(s): North Eastern Railway

Route
- Termini: Shaktinagar Terminal (SKTN); Tanakpur (TPU)
- Stops: 36
- Distance travelled: 860 km (534 mi)
- Average journey time: 23 hrs 40 mins
- Service frequency: 4 days a week.
- Train number(s): 15075 / 15076

On-board services
- Class(es): AC 2 tier, AC 3 tier, Sleeper class, General Unreserved
- Seating arrangements: No
- Sleeping arrangements: Yes
- Catering facilities: On-board catering, E-catering
- Observation facilities: Large windows
- Baggage facilities: No
- Other facilities: Below the seats

Technical
- Rolling stock: LHB coach
- Track gauge: 1,676 mm (5 ft 6 in)
- Operating speed: 36 km/h (22 mph) average including halts.

The 15075 / 15076 Shaktinagar Terminal-Tanakpur Triveni Express is an Express train belonging to North Eastern Railway zone that runs between Shaktinagar Terminal and Tanakpur in India. It is currently being operated with 15075/15076 train numbers on a four-day-a-week basis.

The name Triveni signifies the Triveni Sangam or the meeting pointing of three riv:eof the Ganges, the Yam,una and the Saraswati at Prayag in Prayag,raj which is a station on the train's route.

== Service ==
The 24369/Triveni Express has an average speed of 36 km/h and covers 741 km in 20h 50m. The 24370/Triveni Express has an average speed of 37 km/h and covers 741 km in 19h 55m.

== Route and halts ==
The important halts of the train are:

- Shaktinagar Terminal
- Chopan
- Sonbhadra
- Chunar Junction
- Mirzapur
- Vindhyachal
- Naini Junction
- Prayagraj Junction
- Prayag Junction
- Rae Bareli Junction
- Lucknow Charbagh
- Hardoi
- Shahjahanpur
- Bareilly Junction
- Bareilly City
- Izzatnagar
- Pilibhit Junction
- Tanakpur

== Coach composition ==
The train has standard ICF rakes with max speed of 110 kmph. The train consists of 15 coaches:

- 1 AC II Tier
- 1 AC III Tier
- 4 Sleeper Coaches
- 7 General
- 2 Seating cum Luggage Rake

== Traction ==
Both trains are hauled by a Izzatnagar Loco Shed-based WAP-4 electric locomotive from Shaktinagar to Tanakpur and vice versa.

== Rake sharing ==
The train shares its rake with 14369/14370 Triveni Express

== Direction reversal ==
The train reverses its direction 1 times:

- Prayagraj Junction

== See also ==
- Shaktinagar Terminal railway station
- Bareilly Junction railway station
- Pilibhit Junction railway station
