= Singrauli–Hazrat Nizamuddin Superfast Express =

Train in India

Singrauli–Hazrat Nizamuddin Urjadhani Express

Overview
- Service type: Superfast
- Status: Operating
- First service: 12 August 2017; 8 years ago
- Current operator: West Central Railway

Route
- Termini: Singrauli (SGRL); Hazrat Nizamuddin (NZM)
- Stops: 12
- Distance travelled: 1,086 km (675 mi)
- Average journey time: 18 hrs 10 mins
- Service frequency: Bi-weekly (Note: Runs twice day in a week for every direction.)
- Train number: 22167 / 22168

On-board services
- Classes: AC 2 Tier, AC 3 Tier, Sleeper Class, General Unreserved
- Seating arrangements: No
- Sleeping arrangements: Yes
- Catering facilities: On-board catering, E-catering
- Entertainment facilities: No
- Baggage facilities: Yes
- Other facilities: Below the seats

Technical
- Rolling stock: LHB coach
- Track gauge: 1,676 mm (5 ft 6 in)
- Operating speed: 60 km/h (37 mph) average including halts.
- Depot: Rani Kamalapati (RKMP)
- Rake maintenance: Rani Kamalapati (RKMP)
- Rake sharing: 22165/22166 Bhopal-Singrauli Urjadhani Express; 11631/11632 Bhopal-Dhanbad Express; 11633/11634 Bhopal-Chopan Weekly Express

The 22167 / 22168 Singrauli–Hazrat Nizamuddin Urjadhani Express is a superfast train belonging to West Central Railway zone that runs between Singrauli and Hazrat Nizamuddin in India. It is currently operated with 22167/22168 train numbers on a Biweekly basis.

== Service ==
The 22167/Singrauli–Hazrat Nizamuddin SF Express has an average speed of 59 km/h and covers 1073 km in 18h 20m. The 22168/Hazrat Nizamuddin–Singrauli SF Express has an average speed of 57 km/h and covers 1073 km in 18h 45m.

== Route and halts ==
The important halts of the train are:

- Singrauli
- Bargawan
- Beohari
- Katni Murwara
- Damoh
- Saugor
- Jhansi Junction
- Agra Cantonment
- Mathura Junction
- Faridabad
- Hazrat Nizamuddin

== Coach composition ==
The train has standard ICF rakes with a maximum speed of 110 kmph. The train consists of 17 coaches:

- 1 First AC
- 1 AC II Tier
- 4 AC III Tier
- 10 Sleeper coaches
- 6 General Unreserved
- 2 Seating cum Luggage Rake

== Rake sharing ==
The train shares its rake with 22165/22166 Bhopal-Singrauli Urjadhani Express, 11631/11632 Bhopal - Dhanbad Express & 11633/34 Bhopal - Chopan Express.

== Traction ==
It is hauled by a Tughlakabad Loco Shed or Itarsi Loco Shed based WAP-7 electric locomotive on its entire journey.

== See also ==
- Singrauli railway station
- Hazrat Nizamuddin railway station
- Bhopal–Singrauli Superfast Express
- Bhopal- Dhanbad Express
- Bhopal - Chopan Express
