= Varanasi–Singrauli Intercity Express =

Varanasi Junction - Singrauli Intercity Express
Overview
- Service type: Express
- First service: 1 July 2011; 14 years ago
- Current operator: East Central Railway zone

Route
- Termini: Varanasi Junction; Singrauli
- Stops: 7
- Distance travelled: 210 km (130 mi)
- Average journey time: 5 hours
- Service frequency: Daily
- Train number: 13345 / 13346

On-board services
- Class: general unreserved
- Seating arrangements: Yes
- Sleeping arrangements: No
- Catering facilities: No

Technical
- Rolling stock: Standard Indian Railways Coaches
- Track gauge: 1,676 mm (5 ft 6 in)
- Operating speed: 30.5 km/h (19 mph)

The 13345 / 46 Varanasi Junction - Singrauli Intercity Express is an Express train belonging to Indian Railways East Central Railway zone that runs between Varanasi Junction and Singrauli in India.

It operates as train number 13345 from Varanasi Junction to Singrauli and as train number 13346 in the reverse direction serving the states of Uttar Pradesh & Madhya Pradesh.

== Coaches ==
The 13345 / 46 Varanasi Junction - Singrauli Intercity Express has two AC Chair Car, ten Non AC chair car, six general unreserved & two SLR (seating with luggage rake) coaches . It does not carry a pantry car coach.

As is customary with most train services in India, coach composition may be amended at the discretion of Indian Railways depending on demand.

== Service ==
The 13345 Varanasi Junction - Singrauli Intercity Express covers the distance of 210 km (130 mi) in 6 hours 40 mins (32 km/h) and in 7 hours 15 mins as the 13346 Singrauli - Varanasi Junction Intercity Express (29 km/h).

As the average speed of the train is less than 55 km/h (34 mph), as per railway rules, its fare doesn't includes a Superfast surcharge.

== Routing ==
The 13345 / 46 Varanasi Junction - Singrauli Intercity Express runs from Varanasi Junction via Chunar, Robertsganj, Chopan to Singrauli.

== Traction ==
As the route is electrified, a Patratu based WDM-3A diesel locomotive pulls the train to its destination.
