= Madan Mahal–Singrauli Intercity Express =

Train in India

Jabalpur-Singrauli Intercity Express
Overview
- Service type: Express
- First service: 24 November 2012; 12 years ago
- Current operator: West Central Railway

Route
- Termini: Jabalpur Junction (JBP); Singrauli (SGRL)
- Stops: 13
- Distance travelled: 349 km (217 mi)
- Average journey time: 7 hours 20 minutes
- Service frequency: Daily. (Note: Runs seven days in a week for every direction.)
- Train number: 11651 / 11652

On-board services
- Classes: AC Chair Car, Chair Car, General Unreserved
- Seating arrangements: Yes
- Sleeping arrangements: No
- Catering facilities: On-board catering, E-catering
- Observation facilities: Large windows
- Baggage facilities: No
- Other facilities: Below the seats

Technical
- Rolling stock: LHB coach
- Track gauge: 1,676 mm (5 ft 6 in)
- Operating speed: 48 km/h (30 mph) average including halts.

The 11651 / 11652 Jabalpur- Singrauli Intercity Express is an intercity train of the Indian Railways connecting Singrauli and Jabalpur in Madhya Pradesh. It is currently being operated with Madhya Pradesh train numbers on a daily basis.

== Service ==
The 11651/Jabalpur - Singrauli Intercity Express has an average speed of 51 km/h and covers 349 km in 6 hrs 50 mins. 11652/Singrauli - Jabalpur Intercity Express has an average speed of 52 km/h and covers 349 km in 6 hrs 45 mins.

== Route and halts ==
The important halts of the train are:

- Jabalpur Junction
- Sihora Road
- Katni South
- Beohari
- Bargawan
- Singrauli

== Coach composite ==
The train has LHB rakes with max speed of 130 kmph. The train consists of 15 coaches :

- 1 AC III Tier Chair Car
- 10 Chair Car
- 2 General
- 2 Second-class Luggage/parcel van

== Traction ==
Both trains are hauled by a Itarsi Loco Shed based WAP-7 electric locomotive from Jabalpur to Singrauli and vice versa.
