= Prayag Junction railway station =

Railway station in Prayagraj district, Uttar Pradesh

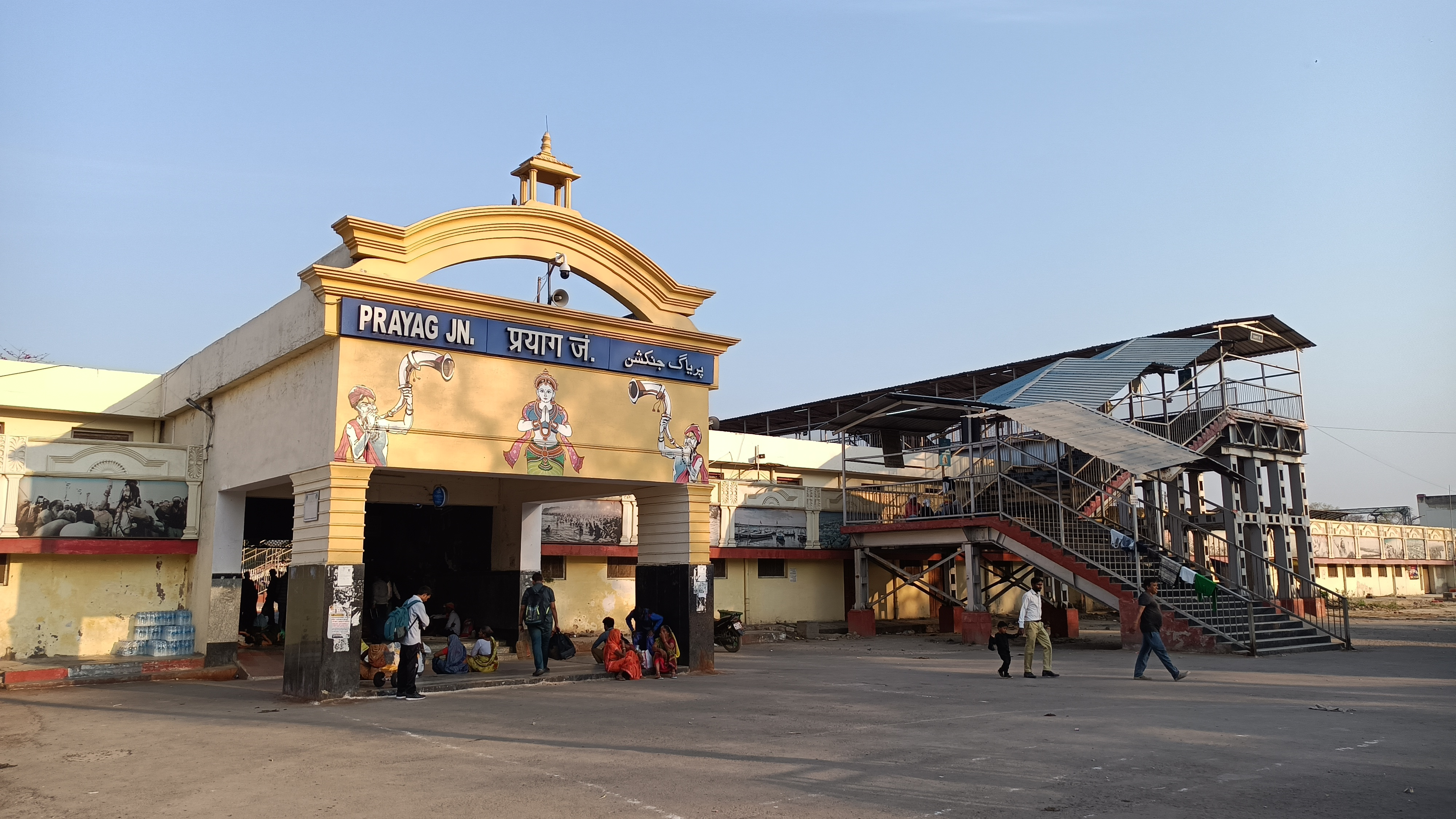

General information
- Location: Railway Station Road, Prayag, Prayagraj, Uttar Pradesh; India
- Coordinates: 25.4683958°N 81.8668377°E
- Elevation: 96 m (315 ft)
- System: Indian Railways station
- Owner: Indian Railways
- Operator: Northern Railways
- Lines: Prayagraj-Varanasi line Prayagraj-Jaunpur line
- Platforms: 3 BG
- Tracks: 7 BG
- Connections: Taxi stand, auto stand

Construction
- Structure type: Standard (on-ground station)
- Parking: Yes
- Cycle facilities: Yes
- Accessible: Available

Other information
- Status: Functional
- Station code: PRG
- Zone(s): Northern Railway zone
- Division(s): Prayagraj
Location
- Location within Uttar Pradesh Location within India
- Interactive map

Prayag Junction railway station (station code: PRG) is an important railway station in Prayagraj district, Uttar Pradesh. It serves Prayag town in Prayagraj. It consists of three platforms. The NR is developing the neighbouring Prayagraj Sangam station as a coaching terminal. It is designed by architect M K Singh in the year 2018. There will be five new platforms, two washing lines, and a new station building with a basement.

== Trains ==
Some of the trains that runs from Prayag Junction are:

- Bundelkhand Express
- Unchahar Express
- Saryu Express
- Prayagraj sangam–Kanpur Intercity Express
- Prayagraj sangam–Haridwar Express
- Prayagraj sangam–Lucknow Intercity Express
- Ganga Gomti Express
- Prayagraj sangam–Bareilly Express
- Triveni Express
- Nauchandi Express
- Kashi Express
- Sarnath Express
- Manwar Sangam Express
- Saryu Express
- Shaktinagar Terminal–Tanakpur Express
- Prayagraj sangam–Jaunpur Passenger
- Prayagraj sangam - Ghazipur city DEMU Express

== See also ==
- Indian Railways
- Prayagraj Junction railway station
- Allahabad City railway station
- Prayagraj Chheoki railway station
- Naini Junction railway station
- Subedarganj railway station
