= Bargawan =

Town in Singrauli, Madhya Pradesh

- Town
- Interactive map of Bargawan
- Coordinates: 24°12′00″N 82°27′10″E
- Country: India
- District: Singrauli
- Headquarters: Waidhan
- Website: www.sgrl.gov.in

Bargawan is a Town, Tehsil Headquarter and major economic center in Singrauli district, Madhya Pradesh, India. Mahan Aluminum Industry HINDALCO lies here which is a unit of Aditya Birla Groups.

== History ==
Bargawan was a jagirdari estate ruled by the Raja of Bardi who were under the Maharajas of Singrauli

== Economics ==
This sector plays an important role for the development of the nearby area. Around 1980 the first industries came to the region around the town of Vindhyachal. These were oxygen supplying through the company Air Product Pvt. Ltd and ethylene for the welding processes in power plants. After this, however, no new industries came to the region. In 2009 the influential Aditya Birla Group began planning to develop a power plant and aluminium plant due to the availability of coal in the nearby Majhauli region. These were to be named the Hindalco and Mahan plants and could create opportunities for local people not just in employment but also in contributing to the development of the economy Madhya Pradesh.

== Tourists ==
There are a number of major tourist attracting places in the region such as the Kachan Dam (Gaderiya), Devi Temple (Durghata). And some regional fair (Khodwa). Major tourist place in Bargawan are Durghata Devi Temple and Jhariya Temple. Durghata Devi Temple is located 8 to 9 km (5.0 to 5.6 mi) from Bargawan Main market (town). Many people from nearby town come there for the worship of Durgata Devi. Jhariya Temple is generally famous for lord Shiva. It is located 3 to 4 km (1.9 to 2.5 mi) from the Main Bargawan Town. The surrounding nearby the temple soo quite and soothing, which carries the actually meaning of Quietness.

== Connectivity ==
Bargawan railway station is the second major railway station in the district which provides direct connectivity to some famous places such as Delhi, Katni, Jabalpur, Kolkata, Chopan, Agra, Vidisha, Dhanbad, Asansol, Jhansi, Saugor, Bhopal, Nashik Road, Mumbai, Ahmedabad, Ajmer, Ratlam,Ujjain,Kota. Other transport in the region is provided by buses which allow transit to Rewa, Sidhi, Satna, and other major cities.

National Highway 39 (75) is under construction in the region which will connect Jhansi at the western end to Ranchi at the Eastern end.

== See also ==
- Singrauli railway station
