= Prayag–Lucknow Intercity Express =

Indian express train service

Prayagraj Sangam–Lucknow Intercity Express
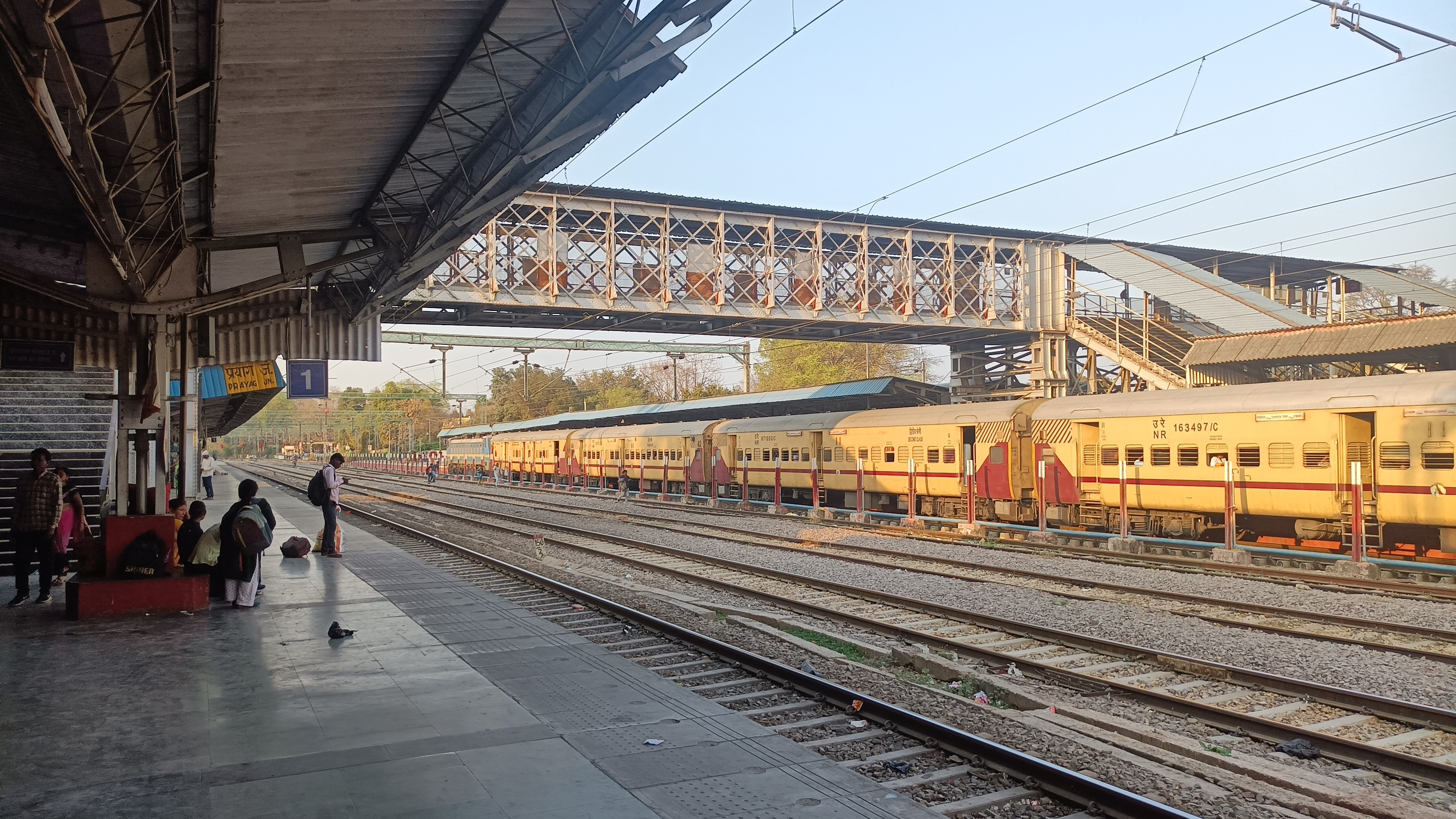
- Prayagraj sangam –Lucknow Intercity Express standing at Prayag Junction

Overview
- Service type: Express
- Current operator: Northern Railway

Route
- Termini: Prayagraj Sangam (PYGS); Lucknow Charbagh (LKO)
- Stops: 11
- Distance travelled: 197 km (122 mi)
- Average journey time: 4h 10m
- Service frequency: Daily (Note: Runs seven days in a week for every direction.)
- Train number: 14209/14210

On-board services
- Classes: Chair Car, General Unreserved
- Seating arrangements: No
- Sleeping arrangements: Yes
- Catering facilities: On-board catering E-catering
- Observation facilities: LHB coach
- Entertainment facilities: No
- Baggage facilities: No
- Other facilities: Below the seats

Technical
- Rolling stock: 1
- Track gauge: 1,676 mm (5 ft 6 in)
- Operating speed: 52 km/h (32 mph), including halts

The Prayagraj Sangam–Lucknow Intercity Express is an Express train belonging to Northeast Frontier Railway zone that runs between Prayagraj Sangam (in Prayagraj) and Lucknow Charbagh in India. It is currently being operated with 14209/14210 train numbers on a daily basis.

== Service ==
The 14209/Prayag–Lucknow Intercity Express has an average speed of 40 km/h and covers 1472 km in 37h. The 14210/Lucknow–Prayag Intercity Express has an average speed of 38 km/h and covers 1472 km in 39h.

== Route and halts ==
The important halts of the train are:

- Prayag Junction
- Kunda Harnamganj
- Unchahar Junction
- Rae Bareli Junction
- Harchandpur
- Bachhrawan
- Nigohan
- Lucknow Charbagh

== Coach composition ==
The train has standard ICF rakes with a max speed of 110 kmph. The train consists of 12 coaches:

- 1 Chair Car
- 9 General Unreserved
- 2 Seating cum Luggage Rake

== Traction ==
Both trains are hauled by WAP-5 or WAP-7 electric locomotive from Prayag Sangam to Lucknow and vice versa since full route is electrified.

== See also ==
- Prayag Junction railway station
- Lucknow Charbagh railway station
- Triveni Express
- Shaktinagar Terminal–Bareilly Triveni Express
