= Vindhyan Ecology and Natural History Foundation =

Indian non-profit organisation

- Founded: 2012
- Founders: Debadityo Sinha, Shiva Kumar Upadhyaya and Ajai Swamee
- Type: Environmental organization
- Purpose: Rivers, Forests, Biodiversity, Environmental justice
- Location: Mirzapur, Uttar Pradesh, India
- Region served: Vindhya Range, Gangetic Plains, Himalayas
- Services: Environmental protection
- Method: Research, Advocacy, Education, Community mobilization, Litigation
- Website: vindhyabachao.org

The Vindhyan Ecology and Natural History Foundation (VENHF) is a registered non-profit organisation (2012) with its headquarter in Mirzapur, Uttar Pradesh, India, working for the protection and conservation of the nature, natural resources and rights of the nature dependent communities in the ecologically fragile landscape of Vindhya Range in India. Vindhya Bachao Abhiyan is the flagship campaign of the organization.

== Programs ==
=== Vindhya Bachao Abhiyan ===
Vindhya Bachao Abhiyan (Hindi pronunciation: [viŋd̪ʱyaː batʃaːoː] English meaning: Save Vindhya Campaign) is the flagship program of VENHF which works towards environmental equity and bringing ecological justice through research-based environmental litigation, strengthening grass-root environmental movements, supporting institution of local governance and protecting the rights of nature dependent indigenous communities.

== Activities and projects ==
=== Natural history research ===
==== Wildlife Inventory of Mirzapur Forests ====
In the year 2017, Vindhyan Ecology and Natural History Foundation in association with WWF-India published a sign-based study on Sloth Bears in Mirzapur, which identified five forest ranges as critical wildlife habitats. The study estimated an area of 430 km^{2} (170 sq mi). of core Sloth bear habitat and a total of 1,110 km^{2} (430 sq mi) of Reserve Forests area which may be protected as wildlife habitat. This study was followed by a camera trap survey in three forest ranges of Mirzapur forest division – Marihan, Sukrit and Chunar – between May 2018 and July 2018. A total of 15 camera traps were deployed at 50 different locations selected randomly covering different habitat types and at locations likely to be used by animals. The said study was conducted in collaboration with Mirzapur Forest Department and was supported by the David Shepherd Wildlife Foundation and Wildlife Trust of India. The study recorded 24 wildlife species, several of which were recorded for the first time in the district. The study also recorded Asiatic wildcat for the first time in Uttar Pradesh. A proposal for Sloth Bear Conservation Reserve was made based on this study.

=== Environmental litigation ===
==== Mirzapur Thermal Power Plant ====
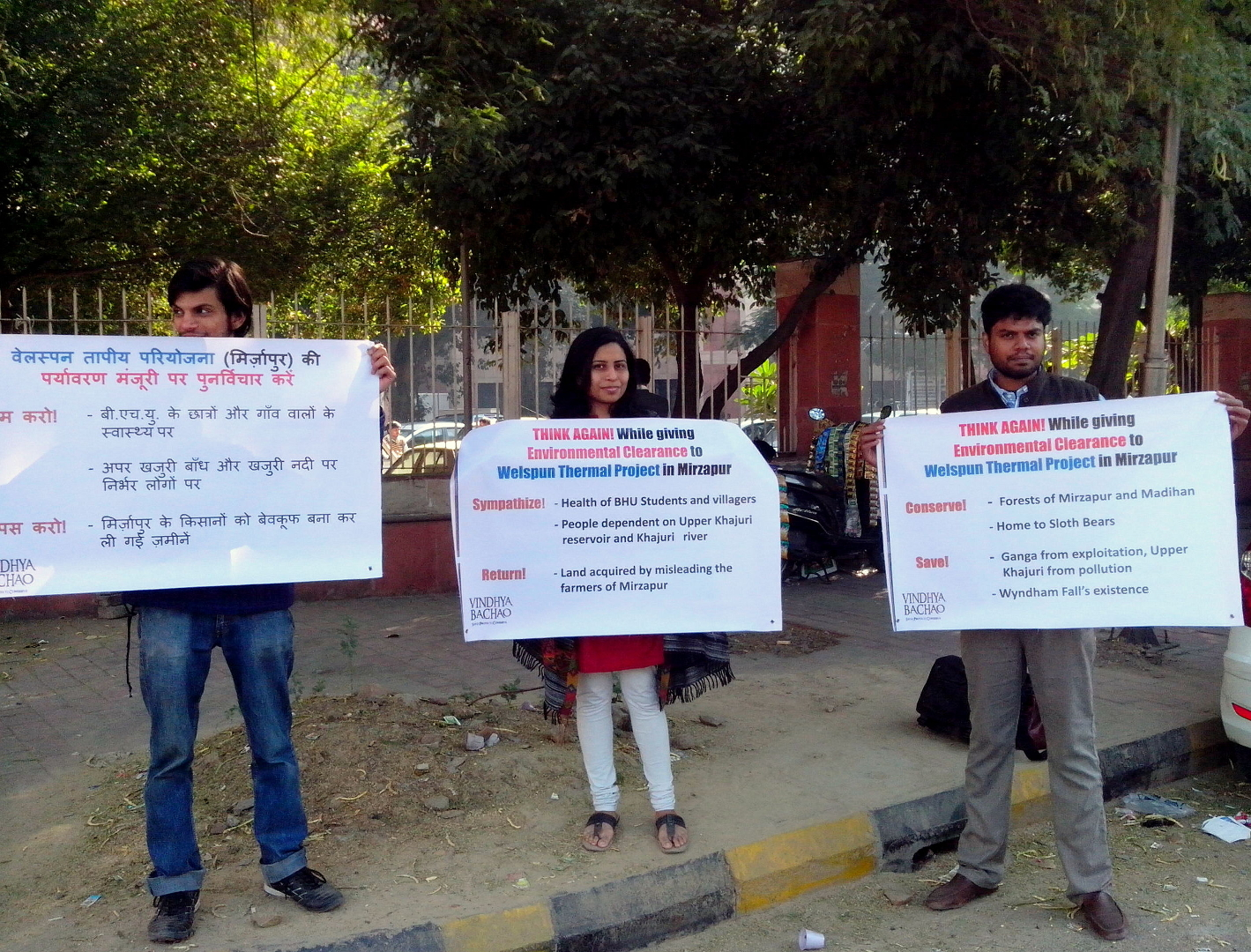
Members of Vindhya Bachao protesting against the Mirzapur Thermal Power Plant of Welspun Energy outside the SCOPE Complex, New Delhi on 18 November 2013

VENHF under the banner of Vindhya Bachao opposed the 1320 MW Coal Based Thermal Power Station in Mirzapur proposed by Ms Welspun Energy U.P. Private Limited since the year 2013. In a site visit report published by Vindhya Bachao in September 2013 it was claimed that the project proponent concealed the information on the presence of forests and several Schedule I species under Wildlife Protection Act, 1972 in the EIA Report is submitted to the Ministry of Environment and Forests (India). In 2013 it was reported by Down to Earth that the plan was "mired in controversy following allegations that the company concealed information about the presence of forestland and endangered wildlife at the project site. The farmers in the region have also been protesting against the project, alleging the company bought land for the project by cheating them." Debadityo Sinha, founder of VENHF in his articles claimed that the project will be a threat to river Ganga and the upper Khajuri Reservoir for drinking and irrigation. It was apprehended that the project if comes into existence will also threaten a historic waterfall of Mirzapur known as Wyndham Fall and will also jeopardise the drinking water supply of the newly established Rajiv Gandhi South campus of Banaras Hindu University. He also made an allegation that the Public Hearing process for the project was greatly compromised and local people were prohibited from entering the public hearing premises. In a research paper published by VENHF in an international open-source scientific journal Present Environment and Sustainable Development of Walter de Gruyter in its October 2015 edition, the land use land cover map of the project site was submitted by the company is contradicted.

The National Green Tribunal, New Delhi quashed the Environmental Clearance granted to the project in its judgment dated 21 December 2016 in a matter filed by Vindhya Bachao members Debadityo Sinha, Shiva Kumar Upadhyaya and Mukesh Kumar.

Vindhya Bachao Website has a separate portal Mirzapur Thermal Power Plant Resource Page with extensive information resources on the project, including site visit reports, minutes of MoEF meetings discussing the project, accounts of protests, and documents submitted by Welspun Energy.

==== Kanhar Dam ====
Vindhya Bachao Abhiyan exposed the illegalities in environment clearance and forest clearance surrounding the controversial Kanhar Dam Project in Sonbhadra district, Uttar Pradesh on Kanhar River. The information collected by Vindhya Bachao using the Right to Information Act, 2005 was the basis of challenging the construction of the dam. Members of Vindhya Bachao and the People's Union for Civil Liberties challenged the project in National Green Tribunal, New Delhi. The construction of the dam was thereafter stayed by the National Green Tribunal in December 2014.

The Chief Secretary of the Chhattisgarh government in April 2015 took note of the irregularities highlighted by Vindhya Bachao Abhiyan and asked the Uttar Pradesh government to stop the construction until the survey and compensation for the affected villages are completed.

The National Green Tribunal passed its final judgement on 7 May 2015 staying any new construction to be undertaken but allowing the construction already underway. The court also formed a high-level committee under the chairmanship of Principal Chief Conservator of Forests, Uttar Pradesh to report on the directions issued in the judgment. The members filed a review petition against the judgment passed by the tribunal, following which the court gave a direction on 7 July 2015 that "This Application is disposed of with an observation that upon the filing of the report by High Power Committee; constituted under the Judgment of the Tribunal, the Tribunal will pass further directions after hearing the parties regarding all matters as mentioned in the Judgment including Environmental Clearance and Forest Clearance." The Tribunal through its order dated 21 September 2015 issued a show-cause notice to the Principal Chief Conservator of Forests, Uttar Pradesh for not submitting the report within the deadline. One of the articles published by Vindhya Bachao Abhiyan on its portal in December 2015 states that the petitioners are unsatisfied with the report submitted by the committee and alleged that the State government is violating the judgment passed by the tribunal in its 7 May 2015 order.

Vindhya Bachao Website has a separate portal Kanhar Dam Resource Page for sharing the latest updates on the Kanhar Dam cases.

==== Ecosensitive Zone around Kaimoor Wildlife Sanctuary ====
Vindhyan Ecology and Natural History Foundation challenged the declaration of 1 km Eco-Sensitive Zone around Kaimoor Wildlife Sanctuary in the districts of Mirzapur and Sonbhadra in Uttar Pradesh at the National Green Tribunal, New Delhi The petition said the Ministry of Environment, Forest and Climate Change should have taken into consideration the ecologically sensitive areas, water bodies, forests wildlife habitats and other eco-sensitive areas based site selection and should not apply the uniform distance. The tribunal dismissed the plea, which was also upheld by the Supreme court of India.

=== Ganges River conservation ===
Members of Vindhya Bachao along with Bharat Jhunjhunwala and other environmentalists wrote to the Ministry of Water Resources (India), World Bank and other states of India on the ecological and cultural impacts of reviving the National Waterway 1 on river Ganges.

=== Wildlife conservation ===
==== Kaimoor Wildlife Sanctuary ====
VENHF sent a representation to the Ministry of Environment, Forests and Climate Change, Government of India on the proposed draft notification declaring 1 km Eco-sensitive zone around the Kaimoor Wildlife Sanctuary. The representation was endorsed by renowned wildlife experts Mike Pandey and Asad Rahmani.

==== Saving the Habitat campaign ====
VENHF hosts an information portal called Saving the Habitat which shares information on the wildlife of Mirzapur. In December 2014 the organization sent a representation to the Government of India demanding some areas of Mirzapur Forest Division to be declared as Protected areas of India.

=== Environmental law and advocacy ===
In June 2015 VENHF reviewed the Draft Notification on Emission Standards for Thermal Power Plants in India and sent a representation to Government of India.

In October 2015 VENHF sent a representation on the Draft Environment Laws (Amendment) Bill, 2015 to Government of India in which it claimed that the bill will dilute the Environment Protection Act, 1986.

== Awards and recognition ==
=== The Sanctuary Wildlife Service Award 2019 ===
Debadityo Sinha, the founder of Vindhyan Ecology and Natural History Foundation was awarded the Sanctuary Wildlife Service Award on 20 December 2019 by Sanctuary Asia, DSP Mutual Fund and IndusInd Bank.

=== National E-Governance Award 2019–20 ===
Mr Firoz Ahmad, Forestry and Remote Sensing expert associated with VENHF got the 'National E-Governance Award 2019-20' from 'Department of Administrative Reforms and Public Grievances, Ministry of Personnel, Public Grievances and Pensions, Government of India' during 23rd National Conference on E-Governance' held in Mumbai on 7–8 February 2020.

== Networking organizations ==
VENHF is partner of EKOenergy and Global Call for Climate Action The organization has published studies in association with WWF-India, Wildlife Trust of India, Earth Matters Foundation, David Shepherd Wildlife Foundation, Government of Uttar Pradesh and Government of Arunachal Pradesh.
