= Dhanraul Dam =

Dhanraul Dam Dhandhraul Dam
- Location within Uttar Pradesh
- Location: Sonbhadra district, Uttar Pradesh (near Robertsganj)
- Coordinates: 24°36′30″N 83°10′12″E
- Type: reservoirs
- Primary inflows: Ghaghar River
- Primary outflows: Ghaghar Canal
- Basin countries: India
- Built: 1917
- Max. length: 21 m (69 ft)
- Max. width: 7,305 m (23,967 ft)

Dhanraul Dam is also known as Dhandhraul Dam. It is located about 23 km from Robertsganj on the Robertsganj-Churk road, in Sonbhadra district, Uttar Pradesh, India. The dam was constructed over the river Ghaghar and water from its reservoir is used for irrigation by the canals originating from here like Ghaghar canal to the nearer districts Mirzapur, Chandauli and Sonbhadra. Dhanraul Dam's water supplies Robertsganj with drinking water. This dam is constructed on the Ghaghar River and is also called Ghaghar Dam.

== Nearby ==
- Vijaygarh Fort
- Robertsganj
- Churk

Sarita maurya
