= Varanasi–Shaktinagar Terminal Intercity Express =

Varanasi Junction–Shaktinagar Terminal Intercity Express
Overview
- Service type: Express
- First service: 26 July 2013; 12 years ago
- Current operator: East Central Railway zone

Route
- Termini: Varanasi Junction; Shaktinagar Terminal
- Stops: 7
- Distance travelled: 229 km (142 mi)
- Average journey time: 8 hours 15 mins
- Service frequency: Daily
- Train number: 23345 / 23346

On-board services
- Class: general unreserved
- Seating arrangements: Yes
- Sleeping arrangements: No
- Catering facilities: No

Technical
- Rolling stock: Standard Indian Railways Coaches
- Operating speed: 30.5 km/h (19 mph)

The 23345 / 46 Varanasi Junction–Shaktinagar Terminal Intercity Express is an Express train belonging to Indian Railways East Central Railway zone that runs between Varanasi Junction and Shaktinagar Terminal in India.

It operates as train number 23345 from Varanasi Junction to Shaktinagar Terminal and as train number 23346 in the reverse direction serving the states of Uttar Pradesh.

== Coaches ==
The 23345 / 46 Varanasi Junction–Shaktinagar Terminal Intercity Express has five general unreserved & two SLR (seating with luggage rake) coaches . It does not carry a pantry car coach.

As is customary with most train services in India, coach composition may be amended at the discretion of Indian Railways depending on demand.

== Service ==
The 23345 Varanasi Junction–Shaktinagar Terminal Intercity Express covers the distance of 229 km (142 mi) in 7 hours 50 mins (29 km/h) and in 8 hours 00 mins as the 23346 Shaktinagar Terminal–Varanasi Junction Intercity Express (29 km/h).

As the average speed of the train is less than 55 km/h (34 mph), as per railway rules, its fare doesn't includes a Superfast surcharge.

== Routing ==
The 23345 / 46 Varanasi Junction–Shaktinagar Terminal Intercity Express runs from Varanasi Junction via Chunar, Chopan to Shaktinagar Terminal.

== Traction ==
As the route is going to be electrified, a Patratu based WDM-3A diesel locomotive pulls the train to its destination.
