= Salkhan Fossils Park =

Fossil park in Uttar Pradesh, India

- Sonebhadra Fossils Park, Sonbhadra Fossils Park

- Location within Uttar Pradesh Location within India
- Type: fossil park
- Location: Salkhan, Sonbhadra district, Uttar Pradesh, India
- Nearest city: Robertsganj (12 km)
- Coordinates: 24°35′18″N 83°02′27″E
- Area: 25 hectares (62 acres)
- Created: 2002
- Operator: UP Forest Department
- Type of fossils: algae, stromatolites

Salkhan Fossils Park, officially known as Sonbhadra Fossils Park, is a fossil park in Uttar Pradesh, India. It is located 12 km from Robertsganj, near Salkhan village on state highway SH5A in Sonbhadra district. The fossils, notably stromatolites, known to some of the earliest evidence of life on Earth, in the park that belong to the Mesoproterozoic era nearly 1.4 billion years old. The fossils appear as rings on the boulders and are scattered in Fossil rings on boulders in the park which is spread over an area of about 25 hectares in the Kaimoor Wildlife range.

The site was discovered by geologist John Bicknell Auden of the Geological Survey of India (GSI) in 1929. It is one of the world’s oldest fossil sites, much older than other such sites like Shark Bay, Australia and Yellowstone National Park, USA. In 2025, it was nominated to the tentative list of UNESCO World Heritage Sites.

== Geography ==
The fossils found in the Sonbhadra Fossils Park are algae and stromatolites types of fossils. The fossils lies in five distinct patches across the park, which itself is spread over 25 hectares in Kaimur Range, adjacent to Kaimoor Wildlife Sanctuary. It comes under jurisdiction of the State forest department.

== Development and research ==
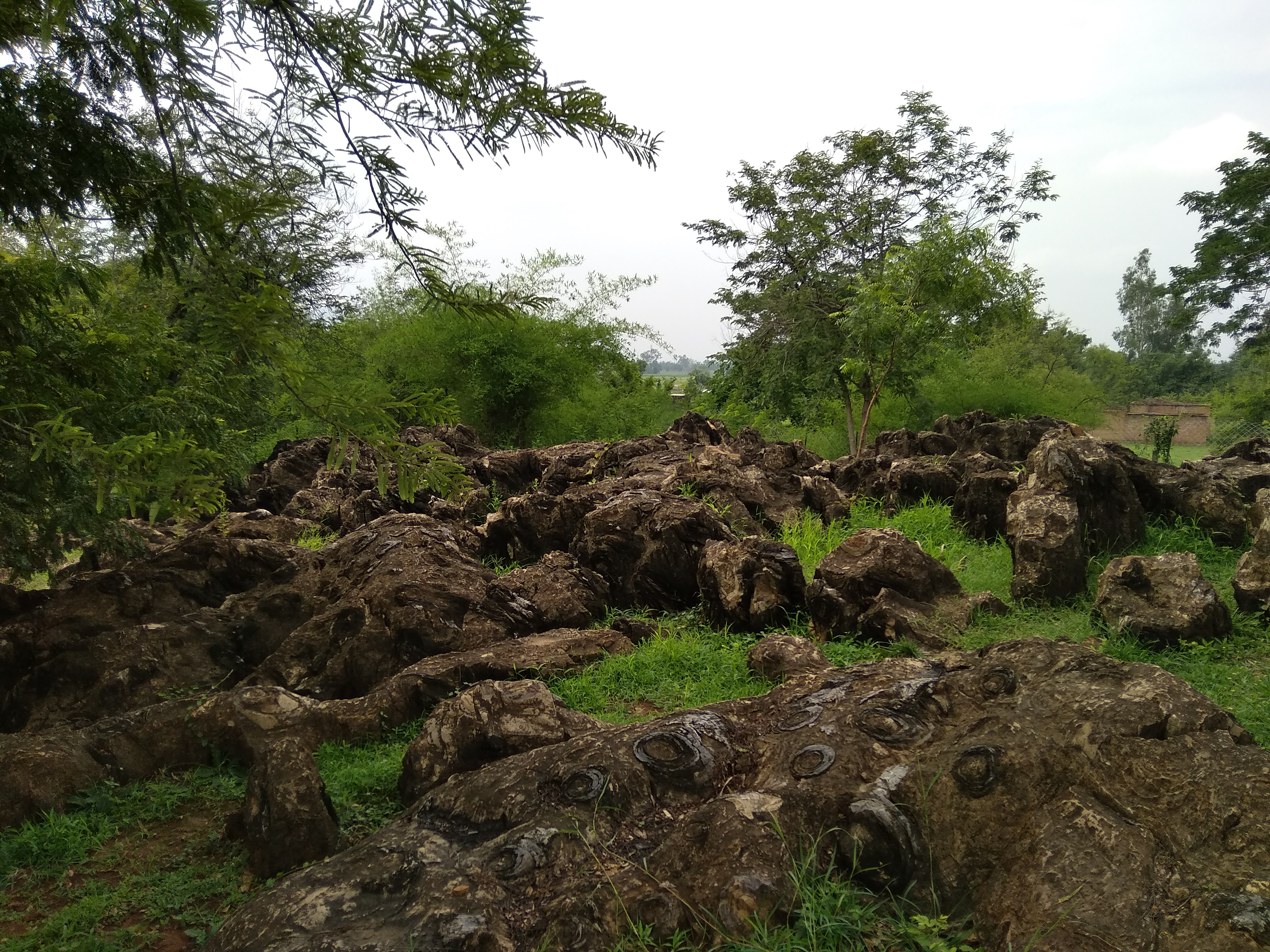
1.5 billion years old Fossils of Blue green algae in Salkhan

Geologists have been aware of the fossils found in the present-day park area since the 1930s. People who have carried out research in the area include Mr. Auden (1933), Mr. Mathur (1958 and 1965), and Professor S. Kumar (1980–81). On 23 August 2001, the area was featured in an article written by journalist Vijay Shankar Chaturvedi for the Hindi newspaper Hindustan. Subsequently, it was formally inaugurated as a fossil park by District Magistrate Bhagawan Shankar on 8 August 2002.

An international workshop was organised in December 2002, attracting participation from 42 delegates from India and abroad. Canadian geologist H.J. Hoffman was impressed by the fossils, and remarked that he had not seen such "beautiful and clear fossils" anywhere else in the world. In 2004, researcher Mukund Sharma further explored the area.

In 2013, the state government sanctioned ₹ 12.5 million for the development of the Salkhan Fossils Park. Since 2024, research is being carried out at the site by Birbal Sahni Institute of Palaeosciences (BSIP), Lucknow.
