= Shaktinagar Terminal railway station =

Railway station in Northern India

General information
- Location: Station road, NH-75, Shaktinagar, Uttar Pradesh; India
- Coordinates: 24.1229°N 82.7047°E
- Elevation: 313 metres (1,027 ft)
- System: Indian Railways station
- Owner: Indian Railways
- Operator: East Central Railway
- Platforms: 3
- Tracks: 8 (Construction – doubling of diesel BG)
- Connections: Auto stand

Construction
- Structure type: Standard (on ground station)
- Parking: No
- Cycle facilities: No

Other information
- Status: Functioning
- Station code: SKTN
- Zone(s): East Central Railway
- Division(s): Dhanbad

History
- Opened: Yes
Location
- Location within India Location within Uttar Pradesh

This railway station is reconstructed and completed in January 2023 Shaktinagar Terminal railway station is a small railway station in Sonbhadra, Uttar Pradesh. Its code is SKTN. It serves the town of Shaktinagar, but the station consists of only one platform and lacks facilities including running water, sanitation and shelter. The station is connected to major cities such as Chopan, Robertsganj, Mirzapur, Allahabad, Rae Bareli, Lucknow, Bareilly, Pilibhit, Tanakpur and Varanasi.

== Trains ==
Some of the trains that run from Shaktinagar Terminal are :

- Shaktinagar Terminal–Tanakpur Triveni Express
- Varanasi–Shaktinagar Terminal Intercity Express
- Chopan–Shaktinagar Terminal Passenger
