= Mirzapur railway station =

Railway station in Uttar Pradesh, India

Mirzapur Railway Station
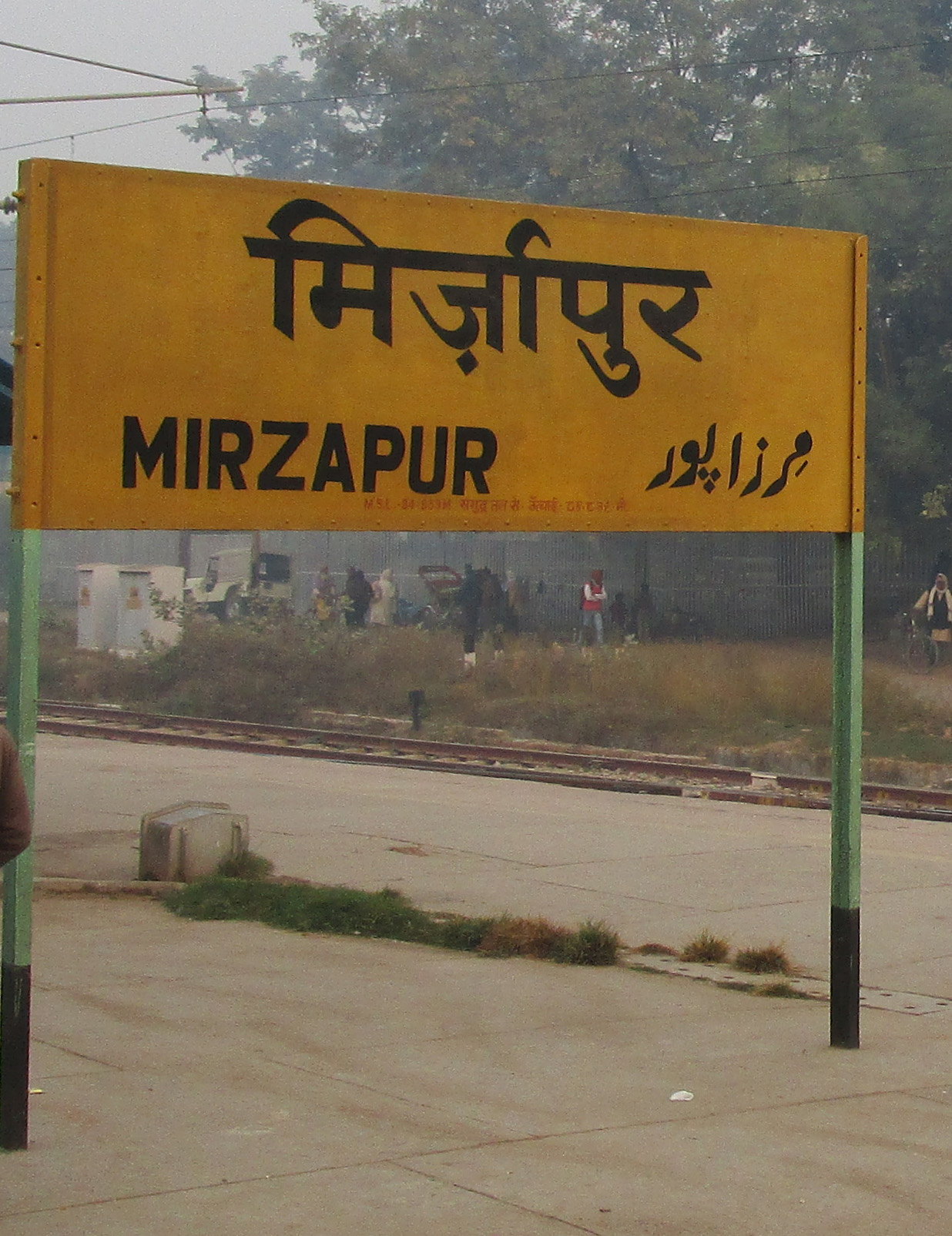

General information
- Location: State Highway 5, Mirzapur, Uttar Pradesh; India
- Coordinates: 25°08′05″N 82°34′08″E
- Elevation: 88 metres (289 ft)
- System: Indian Railways junction station
- Owner: Indian Railways
- Operator: North Central Railway
- Lines: Howrah–Delhi main line Howrah–Prayagraj–Mumbai line Pandit Deen Dayal Upadhyaya Junction – Kanpur section
- Platforms: 3
- Tracks: 6

Construction
- Structure type: At grade
- Parking: Yes
- Cycle facilities: Yes

Other information
- Status: Functioning
- Station code: MZP
- Zone(s): North Central
- Division(s): Prayagraj

History
- Opened: 1864
- Electrified: 1965–66
- Former names: East Indian Railway Company
Location
- Location within Uttar Pradesh

Mirzapur station code MZP is a railway station in Mirzapur district of the Indian state of Uttar Pradesh. It lies on the Howrah–Delhi main line and Howrah–Prayagraj–Mumbai line. It serves Mirzapur and the surrounding areas.

== History ==
The Howrah–Delhi line of East Indian Railway Company was ready up to Naini in 1864 and after the Old Naini Bridge was completed through trains started running in 1865–66.

== Electrification ==
The Dagmagpur–Cheoki section was electrified in 1965–66.

== Amenities ==
Mirzapur railway station has two double-bedded non-AC retiring rooms.

Preceding station	Indian Railways	Following station
Jhingura towards ?	North Central Railway zone Howrah–Delhi main line	Vindhyachal towards ?
