= Kaimoor Wildlife Sanctuary =

Wildlife sanctuary in Uttar Pradesh, India

Coordinates: 24.685°N 83.068°E

- IUCN category IV (habitat/species management area)
- Interactive map of Kaimoor Wildlife Sanctuary
- Location: Mirzapur and Sonbhadra districts, Uttar Pradesh, India
- Area: 500
- Established: 1982

Kaimoor Wildlife Sanctuary is located in Sonbhadra and Mirzapur districts of southeastern Uttar Pradesh. The sanctuary reaches generally east and west along the Kaimur Range, extending to the Son River at its eastern end, and to the border of Madhya Pradesh at its western end. It was established in 1982.

The vegetation consists of 500 square kilometers of verdant land. The topography of the region is as varied as the types of animals that it houses.

== Access ==
=== By air ===
The nearest airport is babatpur, varanasi.

=== By rail ===
The nearest railhead is Robertsganj railway station.

=== By road ===
Kaimoor is accessible by road from Varanasi and Mirzapur (100 km). The nearest town, Robertsganj, 3 km away, is connected by bus services to major centres in the region.

== Attractions ==
The wildlife population comprises leopard, blackbuck, chital, chinkara, ratel and peafowl. The main species of wild animals found in the sanctuary are those of antelope, blue bull, wild cat, karakal, and bijju. There are quite a few varieties of local and migratory birds forming a large part of the wild population.

Important vegetation includes saal, sheesham teek, mahua, jamun, siddha, salai, koraiya and jheengar.

A species of beetle, Maladera kaimurensis was also recently described from the sanctuary.
