= Robertsganj =

- City
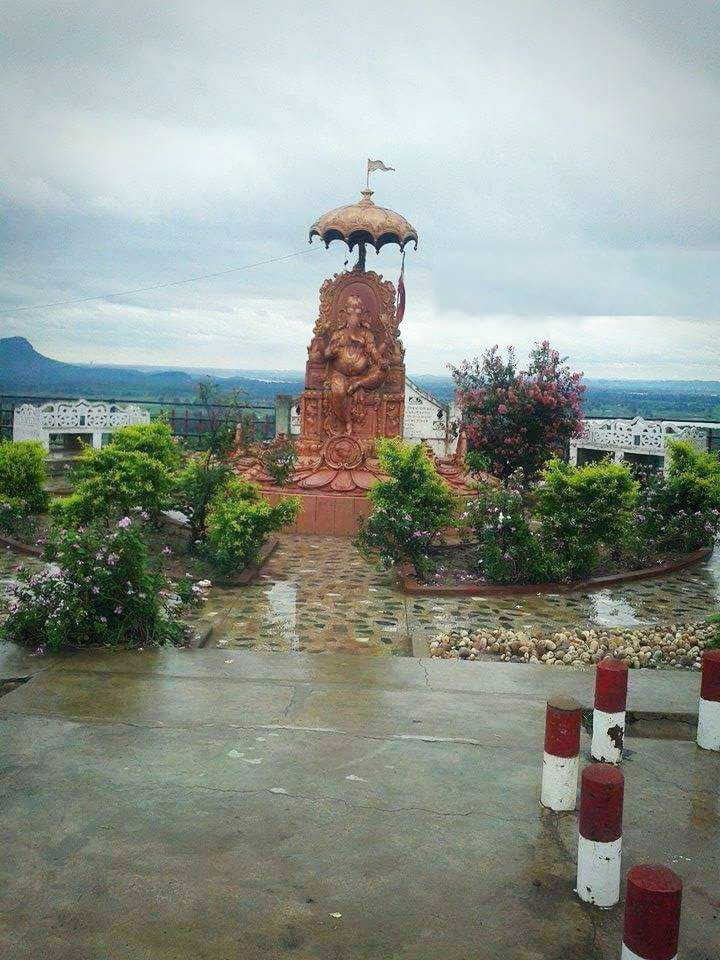

- Location in Uttar Pradesh, India Robertsganj (India)
- Coordinates: 24.7°N 83.07°E
- Country: India
- State: Uttar Pradesh
- Division: Mirzapur
- District: Sonbhadra
- Named for: Frederick Roberts, 1st Earl Roberts

Government
  - Type: Municipal Council
  - Body: Robertsganj Municipal Council
  - Municipal Chairperson: Ruby Prasad (BJP)
  - Lok Sabha MP: Chhotelal Kharwar (Samajwadi Party)
  - MLA: Bhupesh Chaubey (BJP)
  - District Magistrate: Chandra Vijay Singh (IAS)
- Elevation: 330 m (1,080 ft)

Population (2011)
  - Total: 36,689

Literacy Rate
  - in 2011: 84%

Languages
  - Official: Hindi, English
- Time zone: UTC+5:30 (IST)
- PIN: 231216
- Telephone code: +91 5444
- Vehicle registration: UP-64

Robertsganj (Hindi: rŏbartsganj), is a city and a municipal board in Sonbhadra district in the Indian state of Uttar Pradesh.

Robertsganj is located in the south-eastern corner of the state. Robertsganj is the administrative headquarter of Sonbhadra District. The district Sonbhadra and Robertsganj as its district headquarter were created by carving off the southern part of the Mirzapur district on 4 March 1989. Son, Karmnasa, Chandra Prabha, Rihand, Kanhar, Renu, Ghagar and Belan Rivers drain this area. The city is named after Frederick Roberts, 1st Earl Roberts.

Located between Vindhyan Range and Kaimur Range, this area had been the centre of activities of pre-historic man which is evident from the rock paintings (pre-historic cave art) found in abundance in this region.

== Geography ==
Robertsganj is located at 24.7°N 83.07°E. It has an average elevation of 330 metres (1080 feet) from sea level. Robertsganj is located in the south-eastern ranges of the Vindhyachal mountain.

It lies between Kaimur range and Chota Nagpur Plateau region. A river flows on the southern side of the city named Son river in the Chopan town located nearly 25 km south of Robertsganj. Salkhan Fossils Park is situated 16 km from Robertsganj.

== History ==
Robertsganj is named after the Kanpur-born Field Marshall Frederick Roberts, 1st Earl Roberts, Commander-in-Chief of the British Indian Army in 1885–93. The Robertsganj railway station was renamed Sonbhadra in 2018.

== Transport ==
=== Air Flight ===
Robertsganj is located about 82 km from the city of Varanasi, which has also the nearest airport. Flights are available to all major Indian cities including Delhi, Mumbai, Kolkata, Lucknow, Agra, Bengaluru, Chennai, Patna, Khajuraho, Bhubaneswar, Hyderabad, Gaya etc. International connections are Bangkok, Colombo, Hong Kong, Mecca and Kathmandu.

=== Rail ===
The Sonbhadra Railway Station connects Delhi, Jammu, Prayagraj, Ranchi, Tatanagar, Lucknow, Bareilly, Varanasi and Kanpur by rail. Some notable trains passing through the town are

- Muri Express (Jammu Tawi - Delhi - Tata Nagar),
- Jharkhand Swarna Jayanti Express/12873(Hatia - Kanpur - Delhi)
- Triveni Express (Bareilly - Lucknow - Shaktinagar),
- Intercity Express (Singrauli - Varanasi).

=== Road ===
Robertsganj is well connected to Lucknow, Allahabad, Varanasi and Mirzapur by road. Buses are available at all hours of the day from Varanasi, and it normally takes 2 1/2 hours to cover the distance. SH 5A a 6 lane highway built by UPSHA runs through the city from Varansi To Hathinala where it merges with national highway 75E.

The highway connecting Varanasi and Waidhan passes through the city. Though this is not a national highway it is a very busy road because of the towns Dalla, Renukoot, Anpara, Shaktinagar which are sufficiently commercialized areas. National Thermal Power Corporation is in Shaktinagar and also National Coalfield different projects like Singrauli, Khadia, Jayant, Dudhichua, Amlori, Kakri, etc. These areas have several major coal mines which cater to a big part of the coal need of the state. Churk a nearby town is situated around 10 km, where Jaypee Group is establishing a thermal power project.

== Climate ==
Robertsganj has a relatively subtropical climate with high variation between summer and winter temperatures. The average temperature is 32 °C–42 °C in the summer and 2 °C–15 °C in the winter. The weather is pleasant in the rainy season from July to October.

== Demographics ==
As of 2011 India census, Robertsganj is a Nagar Palika Parishad in the district of Sonbhadra, Uttar Pradesh. The Sonbhadra city is divided into 25 wards for which elections are held every 5 years. The Sonbhadra Nagar Palika Parishad (Robertsganj) has a population of 36,689, of which 19,294 are males while 17,395 are females as per a report released by Census India 2011.

=== Sex ratio and child population ===
In Sonbhadra Nagar Palika Parishad, the female sex ratio is of 902 against the state average of 912. Moreover, the child sex ratio in Sonbhadra is around 867, compared to the Uttar Pradesh state average of 902. The Population of children with the age of 0-6 is 4678, which is 12.75% of a total population of Sonbhadra (NPP).

=== Literacy rate ===
The Literacy rate of Robertsganj (Sonbhadra city) is 84%, higher than the state average of 67.68%. In Sonbhadra, male literacy is around 89.32% while the female literacy rate is 78.1%.

=== Households and administration ===
Sonbhadra Nagar Palika Parishad has total administration of over 6, 196 houses to which it supplies basic amenities like water and sewerage. Water supplies from the Dhandhraul Dam in the Robertsganj City. It is also authorized to build roads within Nagar Palika Parishad limits and impose taxes on properties coming under its jurisdiction.

=== Caste factor ===
Scheduled Castes constitute 13.72% while Scheduled Tribe were 0.50% of the total population in Sonbhadra city.

=== Work profile ===
Out of the total population, 10,339 were engaged in work or business activity. Of this 8,362 were males while 1,977 were females. In a census survey, worker is defined as a person who does business, job, service, and cultivator and labor activity. Of the total 10339 working population, 80.55% were engaged in main work while 19.45% of total workers were engaged in marginal work.

== Place of interest ==
=== Historical places ===
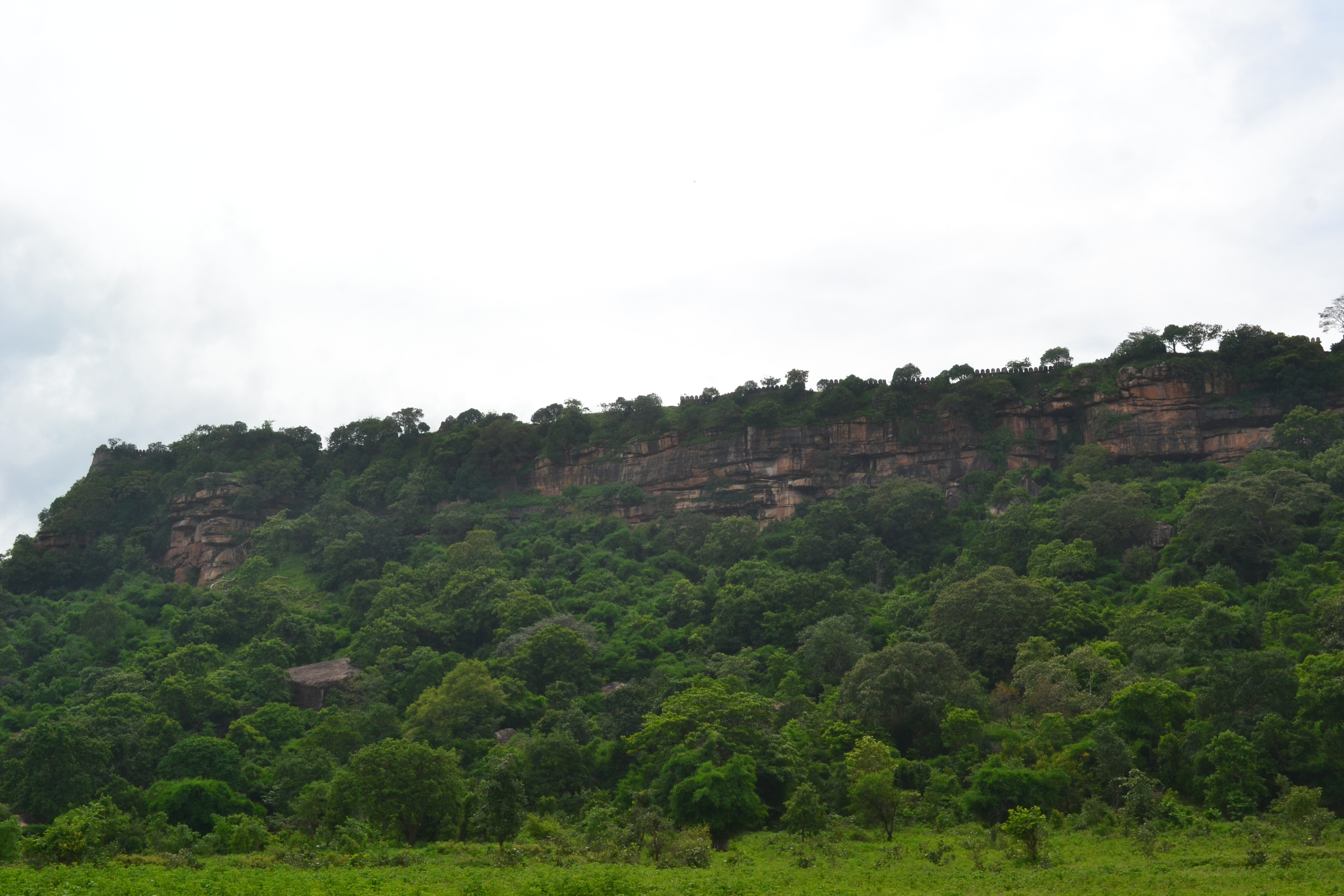
Vijaygarh Fort on the Hill top

- Vijaygarh Fort, Sonbhadra: It is located about 30 km from Robertsganj in south-east direction in Mau Kalan village on Robertsganj-Churk road, in the Sonbhadra District. Built in the 5th century, at a height of 400 feet from the ground level by Kol Kings, the fort is known for its rock inscriptions, cave paintings, many statues and its perennial ponds. There are four ponds inside the premises of the fort which never dry up.
- Sodharigarh Durg, Sonbhadra
- Veer Lorik Stone
- Agori Fort in Chopan.

=== Natural places ===
- Son View Point
- Dhandhraul Dam
- Salkhan Fossils Park
- Kaimoor Wildlife Sanctuary

=== Other nearby ===
- Shivdwar
- Renukeshwar Mahadev Temple
- Rihand Dam
- Jwaladevi Temple

== Media ==
Gaon Girav & Kaimoor Times are among the few Hindi newspapers published from this district.

Chandrakanta, a popular Hindi novel by Devaki Nandan Khatri is related to Vijaygarh Fort. The princess Chandrakanta of Vijaygarh and the prince Virendra Singh of Naugarh. Krur Singh, a member of the Vijaygarh king's court who dreams of marrying Chandrakanta and taking over the throne. When Krur Singh fails in his endeavor, he flees the kingdom and befriends Shivdutt, the powerful neighboring king of Chunargarh fort in Chunar that inspired Khatri to write the novel. Vijaygarh Fort is in Sonbhadra City.

== See also ==
- Frederick Roberts, 1st Earl Roberts
