= Prayag Ghat–Kanpur Intercity Express =

Express train in India

Prayag Ghat Kanpur Intercity Express
Overview
- Service type: Express
- First service: 3 July 2016
- Current operator: North Central Railways

Route
- Termini: Prayag Ghat Terminal; Kanpur Central
- Stops: 13
- Distance travelled: 212 km (132 mi)
- Average journey time: 5 hours 28 mins
- Service frequency: daily
- Train number: 14101 / 14102

On-board services
- Classes: AC Chair Car, Chair car, General
- Sleeping arrangements: Yes
- Catering facilities: No Pantry Car Coach attached

Technical
- Rolling stock: ICF coach
- Track gauge: 1,676 mm (5 ft 6 in)
- Operating speed: 140 km/h (87 mph) maximum,42 km/h (26 mph), including halts

Prayag Ghat Kanpur Intercity Express is an Express train belonging to North Central Railway zone of Indian Railways that run between Prayag Ghat Terminal and Kanpur Central in Uttar Pradesh state of India. this train comes under the Intercity Express category.

== Background ==
This train was inaugurated on 3 July 2016, flagged off by Murli Manohar Joshi, MP from Kanpur for more connectivity between Allahabad and Kanpur.

== Service ==
This train covers the distance of 212 km with an average speed of 42 km/h on both sides.

== Routes ==
This train passes through Prayag Junction, Phaphamau, lalgopalganj, Unchahar & Unnao Junction on both sides.

== Traction ==
As the route is fully electrified, Electric Loco Shed, based WAP-4[wap7] locomotive powers the train from Kanpur to Prayag Ghat
