= Ganga Gomti Express =

Train in India

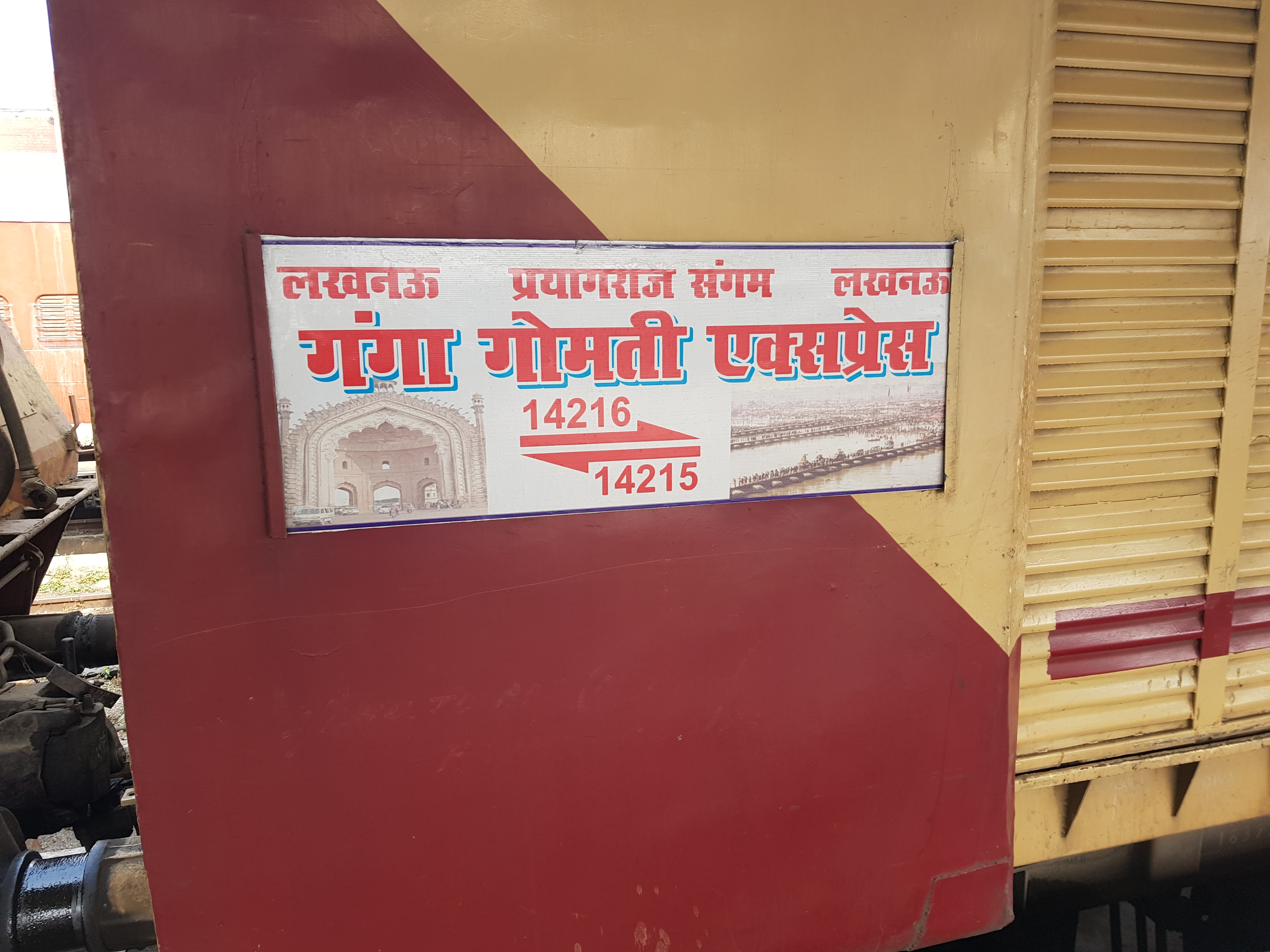

Overview
- Service type: Express
- Locale: Uttar Pradesh
- Current operator: Northern Railways

Route
- Termini: Prayagraj sangam Terminal; Lucknow NR
- Stops: 8
- Distance travelled: 201 km (125 mi)
- Average journey time: 4 hours 25 minutes
- Service frequency: Daily
- Train number: 14215 / 14216

On-board services
- Classes: AC Chair Car, 2nd Class seating, General Unreserved
- Seating arrangements: Yes
- Sleeping arrangements: No
- Catering facilities: No pantry car attached

Technical
- Rolling stock: ICF coach
- Track gauge: 1,676 mm (5 ft 6 in)
- Operating speed: 110 km/h (68 mph) maximum, 44.57 km/h (28 mph) average including halts

The 14215 / 14216 Ganga Gomti Express is an Express train belonging to Indian Railways – Northern Railway zone that runs between Prayagraj sangam terminal and Lucknow Junction in India.

It operates as train number 14215 from Prayagraj sangam Terminal to Lucknow NR and as train number 14216 in the reverse direction serving the state of Uttar Pradesh.

== Coaches ==
This train has 1 AC Chair Car, 12 General Unreserved and 2 SLR (Seating cum Luggage Rake) coaches. It does not carry a pantry car.

As is customary with most train services in India, coach composition may be amended at the discretion of Indian Railways depending on demand.

== Service ==
The 14215 Prayag Ghat Terminal–Lucknow Ganga Gomti Express covers the distance of 201 kilometres in 4 hours 3 mins (47.29 km/h) and in 4 hours 25 mins as 14216 Lucknow–Prayag Ghat Terminal Ganga Gomti Express (45.51 km/h).

== Routeing ==
The 14215/14216 Ganga Gomti Express runs from Prayag Ghat Terminal via Unchahar Junction], Rae Bareli Junction to Lucknow NR.

== Traction ==
As the entire route is now fully electrified, a Ghaziabad-based WAP-5 / WAP-4 locomotive powers the train for its entire journey.

== Timings ==
- 14215 Prayag Ghat Terminal–Lucknow Ganga Gomti Express leaves Prayag Ghat Terminal on a daily basis at 05:50 hrs IST and reaches Lucknow NR at 10:15 hrs IST the same day.
- 14216 Lucknow–Prayag Ghat Terminal Ganga Gomti Express leaves Lucknow NR on a daily basis at 18:10 hrs IST and reaches Prayag Ghat Terminal at 22:13 hrs IST the same day.
