= Welspun Energy =

Independent power company

Welspun Energy Private Limited
- Type: Private
- Founded: 19 August 2002
- Headquarters: New Delhi, India
- Key people: Vineet Mittal (Managing Director); Balkrishan Goenka (Chairman); Kapil Maheshwari (CEO)
- Products: Electric power
- Parent: Welspun Group
- Website: www.welspun.com

Welspun Energy Private Limited (formerly Welspun Energy Limited) is an independent power company based in New Delhi, India. It is a subsidiary of Welspun Group.

== History ==
In March 2013, the company commissioned the 50-MW Phalodi solar plant, which that time was the largest solar plant in India. In December 2013 the company commissioned an 8-MW solar project in Karnataka. In February 2014, it inaugurated the 151-MW Neemuch solar project in Madhya Pradesh, which is the India's largest and among the world largest solar-power plants. In April 2014, GE Energy Financial Services invested US$24 million in this project. This was also GE's first investment into a renewable energy project in India. Also in 2013, Welspun Renewables was registered with United Nations Framework Convention on Climate Change (UNFCCC) under the Clean Development Mechanism program of activities. In May 2014, the company commissioned a 19 MW solar power project in Chitradurga district of Karnataka. Together with the Maharashtra State Power Generation Company WEL has developed a 50 MW solar power plant at Baramati in Pune district. In August 2015, the company commissioned a 34-MW solar project in Bhatinda district of Punjab. The company aims to develop a total of 550 MW solar capacities in Karnataka, 100 MW in Andhra Pradesh, and 150 MW in Punjab.

In June 2014, Asian Development Bank made a US$50 million equity investment into Welspun Renewables, the largest direct equity investment in the renewable energy sector by ADB.

Adani Power entered into agreement with Welspun Energy in October 2015 to buy two ready-to-build coal-fired power plants for Rs. 400 Crore. The plants were a proposed 1,320 MW plant in Mirzapur and another in Madhya Pradesh. In December 2016, the National Green Tribunal withdrew environmental clearance for the Mirzapur plant, making it unlikely that it will be built.

On 12 June 2016, Tata Power announced that it had signed an agreement with Welspun Energy to acquire Welspun Renewables Energy Pvt. Ltd, the latter's subsidiary in the renewable energy industry. The Rs 9,249 crore ($1.4 billion) acquisition will give Tata control of Welspun's 1.14 GW of renewable energy capacity. The deal is the largest solar acquisition in Asia. It was completed on 14 September 2016.

== Controversy ==
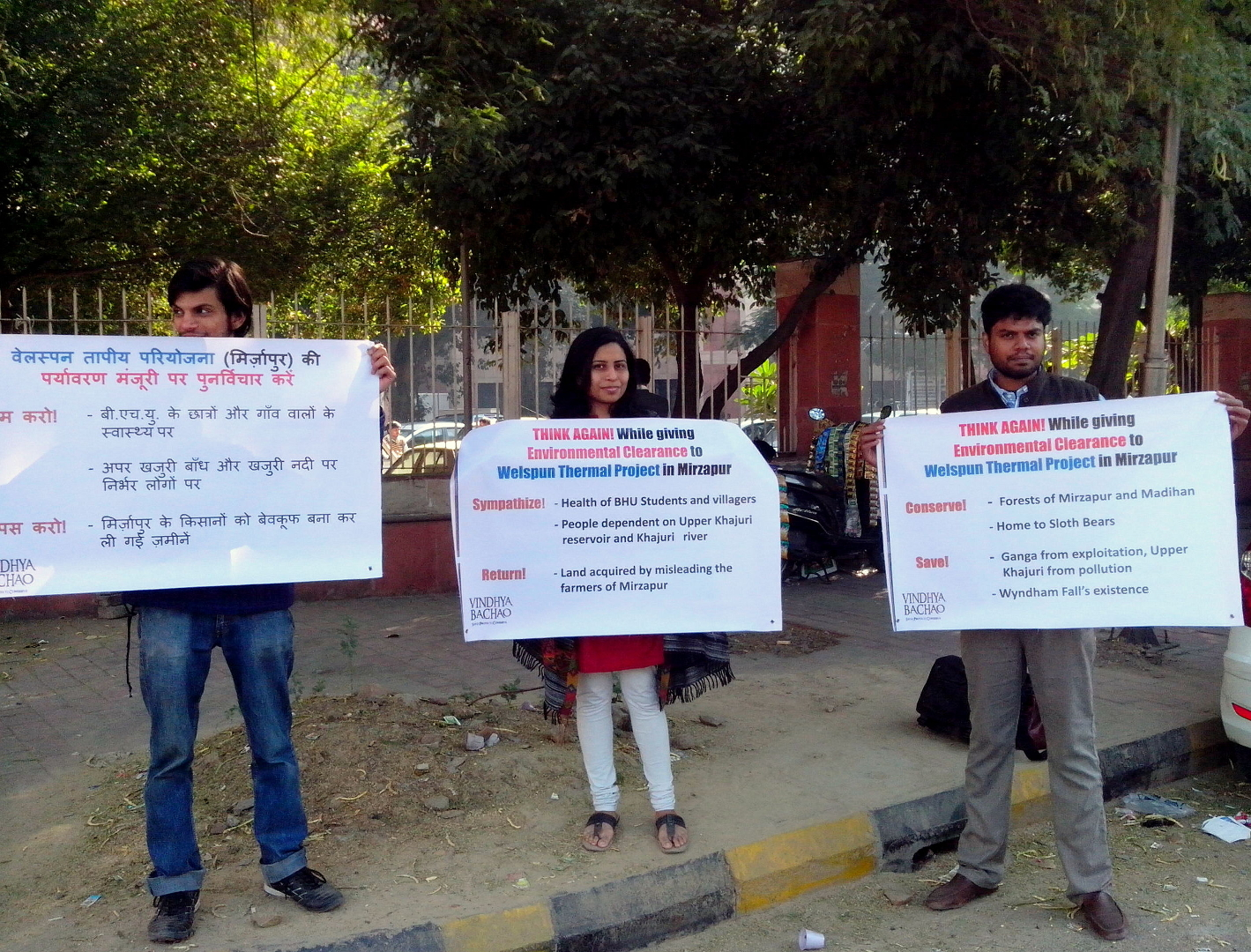
Members of Vindhya Bachao protesting against the Mirzapur Thermal Power Plant in New Delhi on 18 November 2013.

Welspun Power proposed the 1320-MW Mirzapur thermal power plant in Uttar Pradesh and 2,000-MW Katni thermal power plant in Madhya Pradesh. Both of these coal plants were suspected of using unofficial methods to obtain their clearances. While the accusation against the Katni Power plant is still in progress, the Environmental Clearance to Mirzapur Thermal Power Plant has been set aside by the National Green Tribunal, New Delhi in December, 2016.

The main reasons for setting aside the clearances was due to concealing of certain facts, following questionable procedures for its EIA and unfair conduct of public hearing-terming the process of obtaining the green light as 'tainted' by the courts.
