= Vindhyachal railway station =

Railway station in Uttar Pradesh, India

General information
- Location: Vindhyachal, Mirzapur district, Uttar Pradesh; India
- Coordinates: 25.1608°N 82.5020°E
- Elevation: 86 metres (282 ft)
- System: Indian Railways station
- Owner: Indian Railways
- Operator: Allahabad railway division
- Platforms: 3
- Tracks: 4
- Connections: Auto stand

Construction
- Structure type: Standard (on ground station)
- Parking: No
- Cycle facilities: No

Other information
- Status: Functioning
- Station code: BDL
- Fare zone: North Central Railway
Location
- Location within India Location within Uttar Pradesh

Vindhyachal railway station is a small railway station in Mirzapur district, Uttar Pradesh. Its code is BDL. It serves Vindhyachal city. The station consists of three platforms. The platforms are not well sheltered. It lacks many facilities including water and sanitation.

== Trains ==
- Bhagalpur–Anand Vihar Terminal Garib Rath Express
- Chambal Express
- Magadh Express
- Shipra Express
- Mahabodhi Express
- Howrah Mumbai Mail
- Triveni Express
- Rajendranagar Express
- Mahananda Express
- Udyan Abha Toofan Express
- Tapti Ganga Express
- Howrah–Jodhpur Express
- Shaktinagar Terminal–Bareilly Triveni Express
