= Saryu Express =

Indian express commuter train

Overview
- Service type: Express
- Current operator: North Central Railway zone

Route
- Termini: Prayagraj Sangam (PYGS); Mankapur Junction (MUR)
- Stops: 13
- Distance travelled: 203 km (126 mi)
- Average journey time: 6h 50m
- Service frequency: Daily (Note: Runs seven days in a week for every direction.)
- Train number: 14233/14234

On-board services
- Class: General Unreserved
- Seating arrangements: No
- Sleeping arrangements: Yes
- Observation facilities: ICF coach
- Entertainment facilities: No
- Baggage facilities: No
- Other facilities: Below the seats

Technical
- Rolling stock: 2
- Track gauge: 1,676 mm (5 ft 6 in)
- Operating speed: 30 km/h (19 mph), including halts

The Saryu Express is an Express train belonging to North Central Railway zone that runs between Prayagraj Sangam and Mankapur Junction in India. It is currently being operated with 14233/14234 train numbers on a daily basis.

== Service ==
The 14233/Saryu Express has an average speed of 30 km/h and covers 203 km in 6h 50m. The 14234/Saryu Express has an average speed of 34 km/h and covers 203 km in 5h 55m.

== Route and halts ==
The important halts of the train are

- Prayag Junction
- Pratapgarh Junction
- Sultanpur Junction
- Ayodhya Junction

== Coach composition ==
The train has standard ICF rakes with max speed of 110 kmph. The train consists of 17 coaches:

- 8 General Un-Reserved
- 2 Seating cum Luggage Rake

== Schedule ==
Running Days : Daily

Train number	Station code	Departure station	Departure time (IST)	Departure day	Arrival station	Arrival time (IST)	Arrival day
14233	PYG	Prayag Ghat	6:10 PM	Daily	Mankapur	1:05 AM	Next day
14234	MUR	Mankapur	2:45 AM	Daily	Prayag Ghat	8:50 AM	Same day

== Traction ==
Both trains are hauled by a Lucknow Loco Shed or Gonda Loco Shed-based WDM-3A diesel locomotive from Prayag Ghat to Mankapur and vice versa.

== Rake sharing ==
Trainshares its rake with 54110/54109 Mughalsarai–Faizabad Passenger

== See also ==
- Allahabad Junction railway station
- Mankapur Junction railway station
- Mughalsarai–Faizabad Passenger
