= Tanakpur railway station =

Railway Station in Uttarakhand, India

Tanakpur Champawat railway station
- Indian Railways logo

General information
- Location: Tanakpur, Champawat district, Uttarakhand; India
- Coordinates: 29.0673°N 80.1097°E
- Elevation: 263 metres (863 ft)
- System: Indian Railways station
- Owner: Indian Railways
- Platforms: 3+2(under construction)
- Tracks: 2 (5 ft 6 in (1,676 mm) broad gauge)
- Connections: Auto stand

Construction
- Structure type: At grade
- Parking: Yes
- Cycle facilities: Yes

Other information
- Status: Functioning
- Station code: TPU
- Zone(s): North Eastern Railway
- Division(s): Izzatnagar
Location
- Location within India Location within Uttarakhand

Tanakpur Champawat railway station is a small railway station in Champawat district, Uttarakhand. Its code is TPU. It serves Tanakpur city & Champawat.Tanakpur Now Broad gauge. The platform is well sheltered. It many facilities including water and sanitation. It is the terminus of the line in Eastern Uttarakhand.

Due to the steep slope of the line in that region, a train rolled backwards uncontrolled for 35 km after a brake failure, but was stopped at Khatima by putting sand on the tracks.

== Major trains ==
- 12036 / Purnagiri Jan Shatabdi Express
- Tanakpur–Delhi Express (14555)
- Tanakpur–Singrauli Triveni Express (15074)
- Shaktinagar Terminal–Tanakpur Express (15076)
- Tanakpur–Pilibhit Passenger (55372)
