= Sonbhadra railway station =

Railway station in Robertsganj, Uttar Pradesh, India

Sonbhadra Robertsganj

General information
- Location: Robertsganj, Uttar Pradesh; India
- Coordinates: 24.6832°N 83.0779°E
- Elevation: 318 metres (1,043 ft)
- System: Indian Railways station
- Owner: Indian Railways
- Operator: North Central Railway
- Platforms: 2
- Tracks: 4
- Connections: Auto stand

Construction
- Structure type: Standard (on ground station)
- Parking: No
- Cycle facilities: No

Other information
- Status: Functioning
- Station code: SBDR
- Zone(s): North Central Railway
- Division(s): Prayagraj Railway Division
Location
- Location within India Location within Uttar Pradesh

Sonbhadra railway station (station code: SBDR) is a railway station in Sonbhadra district, Uttar Pradesh, India, serving the town of Robertsganj. The station is connected to major cities such as Jammu, Amritsar, Delhi, Kanpur, Prayagraj, Varanasi and Lucknow.

The station has two well sheltered platforms. It has many facilities including water and sanitation. Currently electrification work is being done along with survey to connect it to Varanasi Junction and Pandit Deen Dayal Upadhyay Junction to reduce rush from these stations.

== Trains ==
Some of the trains that runs from Sonbhadra are :

- Shaktinagar Terminal–Tanakpur Express
- Triveni Express
- Chunar–Barwadih Passenger
- Singrauli–Patna Link Express
- Varanasi–Singrauli Intercity Express
- Chopan–Prayagraj Passenger
- Santragachi–Ajmer Weekly Express
- Sambhalpur–Jammu Tawi Express
- Bareilly–Barwadih Triveni Link Express
- Ranchi–Chopan Express
- Tatanagar–Jammu Tawi Express
- Jharkhand Swarna Jayanti Express
