= Howrah–Bhopal Weekly Express =

Train in India

Overview
- Service type: Express
- Locale: West Bengal, Jharkhand, Uttar Pradesh & Madhya Pradesh
- First service: 3 February 2003; 22 years ago
- Current operator: Eastern Railway

Route
- Termini: Howrah Junction (HWH); Bhopal Junction (BPL)
- Stops: 27
- Distance travelled: 1,460 km (907 mi)
- Average journey time: 29 hrs 45 mins
- Service frequency: Weekly
- Train number: 13025 / 13026

On-board services
- Classes: AC 2 Tier, AC 3 Tier, Sleeper Class, General Unreserved
- Seating arrangements: No
- Sleeping arrangements: Yes
- Catering facilities: On-board Catering, E-Catering
- Observation facilities: Large windows
- Baggage facilities: Available
- Other facilities: Below the seats

Technical
- Rolling stock: LHB coach
- Track gauge: Broad Gauge
- Operating speed: 49 km/h (30 mph) average including halts.
Route map
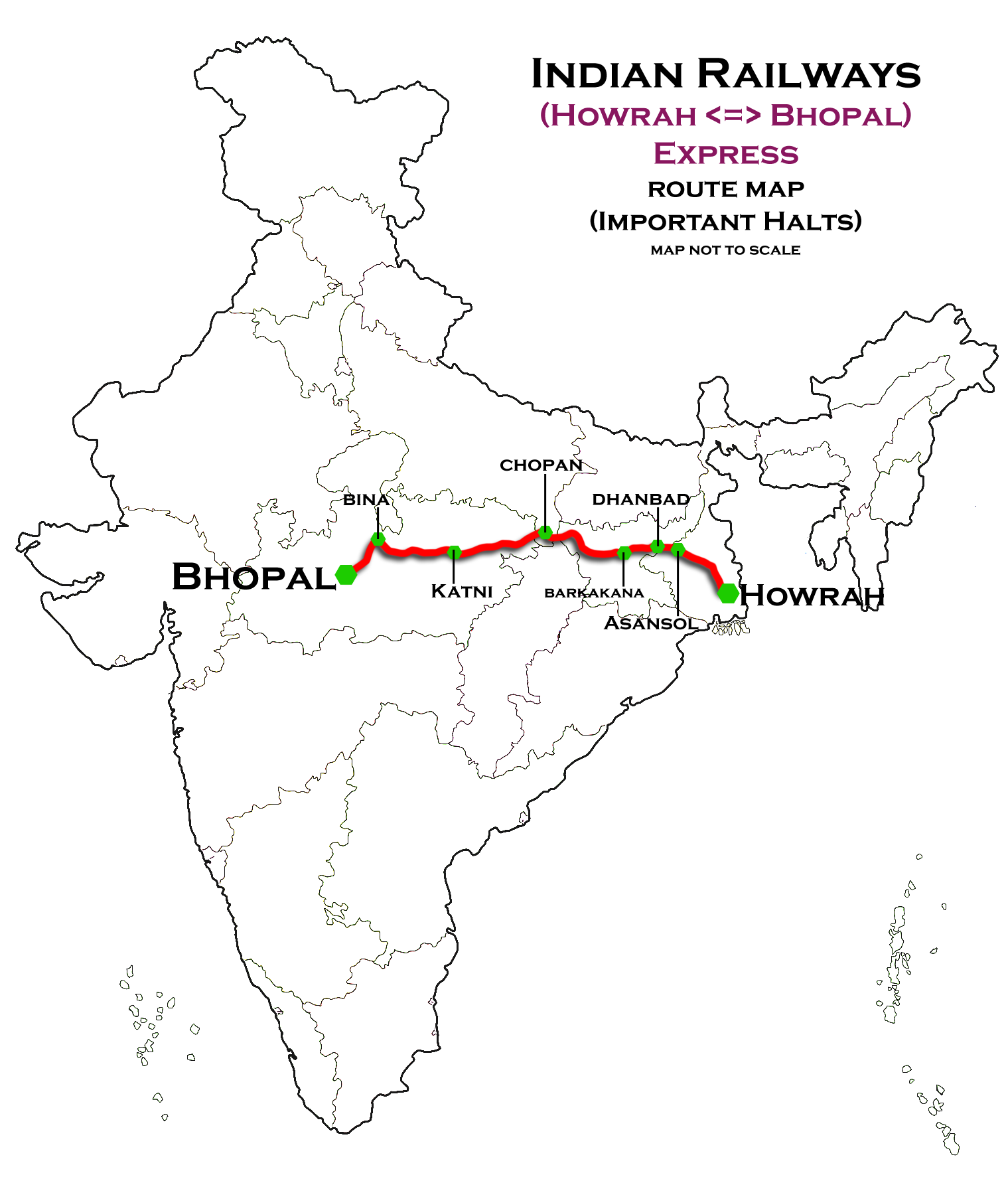

The 13025 / 13026 Howrah–Bhopal Weekly Express is a weekly express train operated by Indian Railways which runs between Howrah Junction railway station in Kolkata, the capital of West Bengal state, and Bhopal Junction railway station in Bhopal, the capital of Madhya Pradesh state.

== Coach composition ==
The train consists 20 LHB coaches:

- 2 AC II Tier
- 4 AC III Tier
- 2 AC III Economy
- 6 Sleeper Class
- 4 General Unreserved
- 1 SLR (Seating cum Luggage Rake)
- 1 EOG (End on Generation)

== Average and maximum speed ==
The train runs with an average speed of 49 km/h, and the maximum permissible speed is 130 km/h (between Dankuni Junction and Dhanbad Junction).

== Timetable ==
Station Code	Station name	Arrival	Departure
HWH	Howrah Junction	---	12:35
BWN	Bardhaman Junction	13:27	13:29
DGR	Durgapur	14:22	14:24
ASN	Asansol Junction	14:54	14:59
DHN	Dhanbad Junction	16:35	16:40
PUS	Phusro	17:48	17:50
GMIA	Gumia	18:10	18:12
RRME	Ranchi Road	19:10	19:15
PTRU	Patratu	20:11	20:13
TORI	Tori Junction	21:00	21:02
LTHR	Latehar	21:56	21:58
BRWD	Barwadih Junction	22:27	22:29
DTO	DaltonGanj	22:53	22:58
GHD	Garhwa Road Junction	23:50	23:55
GHQ	Garhwa	00:04	00:06
RNQ	Renukut	01:16	01:18
CPU	Chopan	02:10	02:30
OBR	Obra Dam	03:05	03:07
SGRL	Singrauli	04:52	05:02
BRGW	Bargawan	05:33	05:35
BEHR	Beohari	07:45	07:50
KMZ	Katni Murwara	10:40	10:50
DMQ	Damoh	12:13	12:15
PHA	Patharia	12:33	12:35
SGO	Saugor	13:25	13:30
KYE	Khurai	14:18	14:20
BINA	Bina Junction	16:00	16:10
BHS	Vidisha	17:08	17:10
BPL	Bhopal Junction	18:20	---

== Traction ==
It is regularly hauled by a Howrah Loco Shed-based WAP-7 electric locomotive from end to end.

== Rake sharing ==
The train shares its rake with 12353/12354 Howrah-Lalkuan Express.

== Direction reversals ==
The train reverses its direction 1 time:

- Chopan.

== See also ==
- Bhopal–Damoh Intercity Express
- Indore Junction
- Bhopal Junction
