= Maladera kaimurensis =

Scientific classification
- Kingdom: Animalia
- Phylum: Arthropoda
- Class: Insecta
- Order: Coleoptera
- Suborder: Polyphaga
- Infraorder: Scarabaeiformia
- Family: Scarabaeidae
- Genus: Maladera
- Species: M. kaimurensis

Binomial name
- Maladera kaimurensis Chandra, Ahrens, Bhunia, Sreedevi & Gupta, 2021

Species of beetle

Maladera kaimurensis is a species of beetle of the family Scarabaeidae. It is found in India (Bihar, Uttar Pradesh).

== Description ==
Adults reach a length of about 9.8 mm. They have an oblong-oval body. The dorsal surface is dark brown and the ventral surface is dark reddish-brown. They are mostly dull (but the head is moderately shiny) and glabrous, except for a few single setae.

== Etymology ==
The species is named the type locality, the Kaimur Wildlife Sanctuary.
