= Churk =

Churk Churk Ghurma
- Town
- Location in Uttar Pradesh, India
- Coordinates: 24°39′N 83°06′E
- Country: India
- State: Uttar Pradesh
- District: Sonbhadra

Population (2001)
  - Total: 8,685

Languages
  - Official: Hindi
- Time zone: UTC+5:30 (IST)

Churk Ghurma is a town and a nagar panchayat in Sonbhadra district in the state of Uttar Pradesh, India. The town is famous for a cement factory which was previously owned by state government. Later, the factory was sold to Jaypee Group and then to the Dalmia Group after the Jaypee Group's insolvency.

== Demographics ==
As of 2001 India census, Churk Ghurma had a population of 8,685. Males constitute 53% of the population and females 47%. Churk Ghurma has an average literacy rate of 70%, higher than the national average of 59.5%: male literacy is 79% and, female literacy is 61%. In Churk Ghurma, 14% of the population is under 6 years of age.

== Climate ==
Climate data for Churk (1991–2020, extremes 1981–2020)
Month	Jan	Feb	Mar	Apr	May	Jun	Jul	Aug	Sep	Oct	Nov	Dec	Year
Record high °C (°F)	30.8 (87.4)	35.8 (96.4)	40.7 (105.3)	44.8 (112.6)	47.0 (116.6)	47.4 (117.3)	43.2 (109.8)	39.0 (102.2)	38.6 (101.5)	38.0 (100.4)	32.6 (90.7)	31.8 (89.2)	47.4 (117.3)
Mean daily maximum °C (°F)	22.4 (72.3)	26.2 (79.2)	32.3 (90.1)	38.4 (101.1)	40.8 (105.4)	37.8 (100.0)	32.6 (90.7)	31.5 (88.7)	31.4 (88.5)	30.7 (87.3)	28.0 (82.4)	24.0 (75.2)	31.4 (88.5)
Mean daily minimum °C (°F)	8.7 (47.7)	11.7 (53.1)	16.4 (61.5)	21.9 (71.4)	25.6 (78.1)	26.7 (80.1)	25.2 (77.4)	24.6 (76.3)	23.8 (74.8)	20.0 (68.0)	14.1 (57.4)	9.6 (49.3)	19.0 (66.2)
Record low °C (°F)	−0.6 (30.9)	0.0 (32.0)	7.2 (45.0)	13.2 (55.8)	15.4 (59.7)	19.7 (67.5)	18.8 (65.8)	20.7 (69.3)	15.1 (59.2)	11.0 (51.8)	3.4 (38.1)	0.0 (32.0)	−0.6 (30.9)
Average rainfall mm (inches)	12.6 (0.50)	15.9 (0.63)	14.5 (0.57)	11.6 (0.46)	15.7 (0.62)	130.0 (5.12)	324.9 (12.79)	318.3 (12.53)	221.2 (8.71)	36.9 (1.45)	5.0 (0.20)	7.0 (0.28)	1,113.7 (43.85)
Average rainy days	1.4	1.4	1.3	1.0	1.7	6.6	13.1	13.0	9.2	2.2	0.4	0.6	52.0
Average relative humidity (%) (at 17:30 IST)	56	50	36	23	26	50	74	80	79	71	61	58	55
Source: India Meteorological Department
