= Singrauli railway station =

Railway station in Madhya Pradesh, India

SINGRAULI
- Indian Railways logo

General information
- Location: Bargawan-Morwa Road, NH 75E, Singrauli, Madhya Pradesh; India
- Coordinates: 24.2047°N 82.6423°E
- Elevation: 375 metres (1,230 ft)
- System: Indian Railways station
- Owner: Indian Railways
- Operator: East Central Railway
- Line: Single line
- Platforms: 4 (1 under construction)
- Tracks: 8 (Construction – doubling of BG)
- Connections: Auto stand

Construction
- Structure type: Standard (on-ground station)
- Parking: Yes
- Cycle facilities: Yes

Other information
- Status: Functioning
- Station code: SGRL
- Zone(s): East Central Railway
- Division(s): Dhanbad

History
- Opened: 1982
- Rebuilt: 2017

Passengers
- 10,000 (approx.)
Location

Singrauli railway station is an important railway station in Singrauli district, Madhya Pradesh. Its code is SGRL. It serves Singrauli city. The station consists of 3 platforms. The platform is not well sheltered. Singrauli Station serves as a major transport point for the nearby areas. It lacks many facilities including water and sanitation. The station has been recently extended to 3 platform with coalyard being shifted few hundred meters away from station. Station has been primarily used by Indian Railways for transportation of coal being excavated from nearby mines. The station falls under the Dhanbad Division of East Central Railway zone and is the only station in Madhya Pradesh under Dhanbad Division.

== Major trains ==
Some of the important trains that run from Singrauli are:

- Dhanbad - Mumbai LTT Weekly Express
- Bhopal - Dhanbad Express
- Singrauli–Patna Express
- Singrauli–Varanasi Intercity Express
- Singrauli–Tanankpur Triveni Express
- Singrauli–Jabalpur Intercity Express
- Singrauli–Bhopal Superfast Express
- Singrauli–Hazrat Nizamuddin Superfast Express
- Ahmedabad Kolkata Express
- Shaktipunj Express
- Chopan–Katni Passenger
- Katni–Chopan Fast Passenger
- Katni–Chopan Mix Passenger

== See also ==
Bargawan
