= Triveni Express =

Train in India

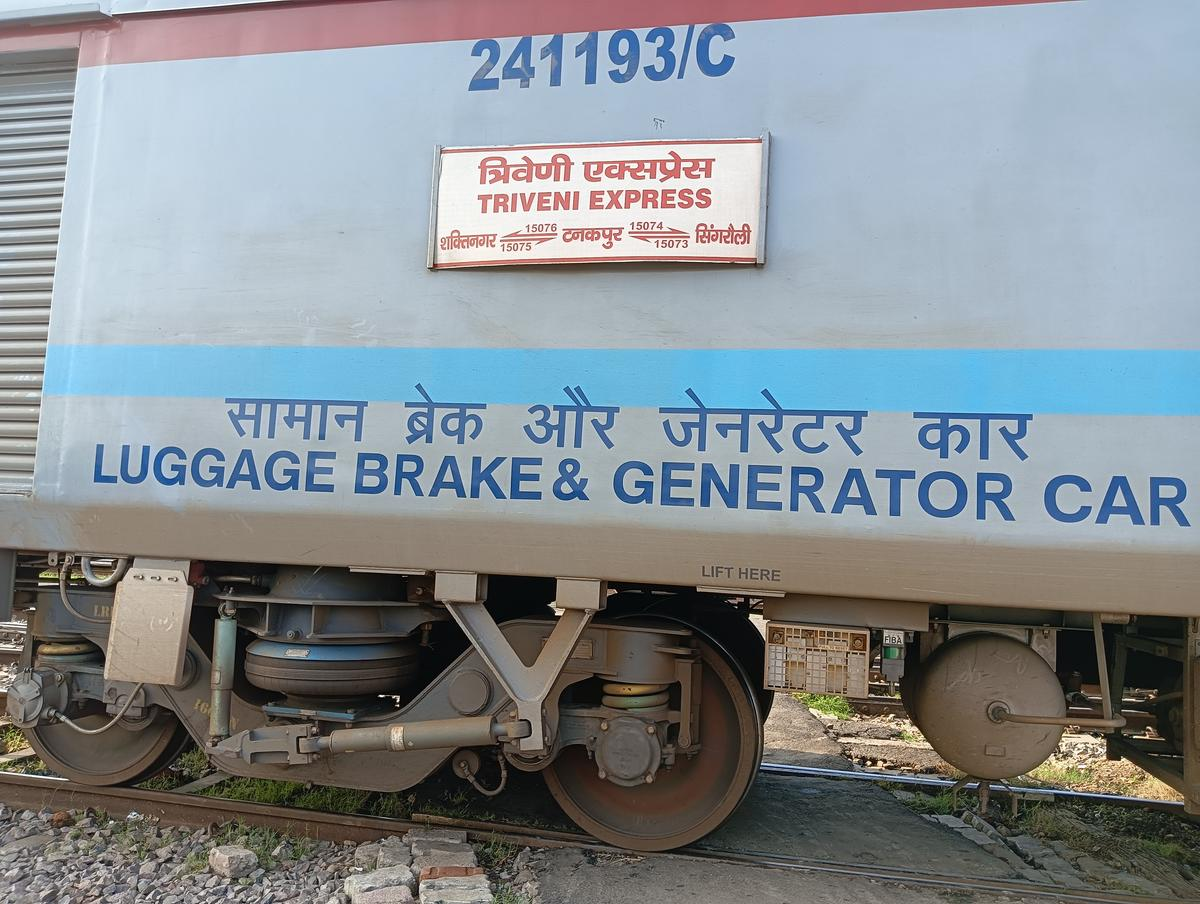
- Triveni Express in LHB avatar.

Overview
- Service type: Express
- Status: In service
- Locale: Madhya Pradesh, Uttar Pradesh & Uttarakhand
- First service: 1 April 1970; 55 years ago
- Current operator: North Eastern Railway

Route
- Termini: Singrauli (SGRL) for 15073/74, Shaktinagar for 15075/76; Tanakpur (TPU) (both)
- Stops: 38 for 15073/74, 36 for 15075/76
- Distance travelled: 842 km (523 mi)for 15073/74, 860 km (534 mi) for 15075/76
- Average journey time: 23 hours 15 minutes for 15073/74, 23 hours 35 minutes for 15075/76
- Train number: 15073/15074, 15075/15076

On-board services
- Classes: AC 2 Tier, AC 3 Tier Economy, Sleeper class, General/Unreserved
- Seating arrangements: Yes
- Sleeping arrangements: Yes
- Catering facilities: Onboard catering, E-catering
- Baggage facilities: Under seat

Technical
- Rolling stock: LHB coach
- Track gauge: 1,676 mm (5 ft 6 in)
- Operating speed: Maximum 110 km/h (68 mph), average 36 km/h (22 mph) with halts.

Triveni Express is an express train and is also known as the "Queen of Sonbhadra". It comes under the Mail/Express category of Indian Railways.

The name "Triveni" signifies the Triveni Sangam (the meeting pointing of three rivers) of the Ganges, the Yamuna and the mystical Saraswati at Prayag in Allahabad, a city on the train's route. This train is the lifeline of the local people of Sonbhadra as it enhances the connectivity of the region.

The train comes under Izzatnagar division of North Eastern Railway. The Permanent Maintenance occurs at the pitlines at Tanakpur. It has 3 rakes.

== Route ==
Initially, the train ran between Lucknow and Allahabad (now called Prayagraj). Later it was extended to Bareilly via Sandila, Hardoi and Shahjahanpur. On 27 February 2019, the train was extended to Tanakpur via Izzatnagar and Pilibhit Also, a slip train bifurcated from Chopan and ran till Barwadih; later it was discontinued. At present the train runs between Shaktinagar/Singrauli and Tanakpur with a rake reversal at Allahabad Junction (Prayagraj).

== Timings ==
- 15073 Singrauli - Tanakpur Triveni Express departs Singrauli at 16:15 hrs on Tuesdays, Thursdays and Saturdays. It reaches Tanakpur the next day at 15:30 hrs.
- 15074 Tanakpur - Singrauli Triveni Express departs Tanakpur at 08:25 hrs on Mondays, Wednesdays and Fridays. It reaches Singrauli the next day at 07:55 hrs.
- 15075 Shaktinagar - Tanakpur Triveni Express departs Shaktinagar at 15:45 hrs on Sundays, Mondays, Wednesdays and Fridays. It reaches Tanakpur the next day at 15:20 hrs.
- 15076 Tanakpur - Shaktinagar Triveni Express departs Tanakpur at 08:25 hrs on Saturdays, Sundays, Mondays and Thursdays. It reaches Shaktinagar the next day at 08:20 hrs.

== Traction ==
Initially, the train was powered by a diesel locomotive between Singrauli/Shaktinagar and Chunar Jn. Then it was powered by an electric locomotive between Chunar & Allahabad (now Prayagraj). After a rake reversal there, it would be powered by a diesel locomotive of Lucknow shed for the remainder of its journey.

At present, the train is hauled by a WAP-4 or WAP-7 of IZN shed or a WAG-9 of CNB shed for its entire journey.

== Rolling stock ==
Originally, the train ran with conventional ICF coaches. Then it was upgraded with Hybrid LHB coaches. Since 5 October 2023, this train has been running with 22 regular Linke-Hoffman-Busch (LHB) coaches, becoming the last train in Indian Railways to have used the Hybrid LHB coaches. In total, 3 rakes used by 15073/74 and 15075/76 whose primary maintenance is done at Tanakpur.

Coach Position of 15073 & 15075

Loco	1	2	3	4	5	6	7	8	9	10	11	12	13	14	15	16	17	18	19	20	21	22
	EOG	M7	M6	M5	M4	M3	M2	M1	A2	A1	S7	S6	S5	S4	S3	S2	S1	GN	GN	GN	GN	SLR

Coach Position of 15074 & 15076

Loco	1	2	3	4	5	6	7	8	9	10	11	12	13	14	15	16	17	18	19	20	21	22
	SLR	GN	GN	GN	GN	S1	S2	S3	S4	S5	S6	S7	A1	A2	M1	M2	M3	M4	M5	M6	M7	EOG

== See also ==
- Singrauli railway station
- Bareilly Junction railway station
- Shaktinagar Terminal - Bareilly Triveni Express
