= Prayagraj railway division =

Railway division of Indian Railways

Prayagraj Railway Division

Overview
- Parent company: North Central Railways
- Headquarters: Prayagraj
- Founders: Indian Railways

Prayagraj Division (formerly Allahabad Division) is one of the three railway divisions under the jurisdiction of North Central Railway zone of the Indian Railways. This railway division was formed on 5 November 1951, and its headquarter is located at Prayagraj in the state of Uttar Pradesh of India.

Jhansi Division and Agra Division are the other two railway divisions under North Central Railway Zone headquartered at Prayagraj.

== List of Railway Stations under Amrit Bharat Station scheme ==
List of the Railway stations under Prayagraj Division and are part of Amrit Bharat Station scheme:

1. Prayagraj Junction railway station
2. Fatehpur Railway Station
3. Kanpur Railway Station
4. Mirzapur Railway Station
5. Vindhyachal Railway Station
6. Firozabad Railway Station
7. Tundla Railway Station
8. Etawah Railway Station
9. Anwarganj Railway Station
10. Govindpuri Railway Station
11. PankiDham Railway Station
12. Mainpuri Railway Station
13. Shikohabad Railway Station
14. Khurja Railway Station
15. Shonbhdra Railway Station
16. Chunar Railway Station
17. Manikpur Railway Station

== List of railway stations and towns ==
The list includes the stations under the Prayagraj railway division and their station category.

Category of station	No. of stations	Names of stations
A-1 Category	2	Prayagraj Junction, Kanpur Central
A Category	5	Aligarh, Etawah, Fatehpur, Phaphund, Mirzapur
B Category	-	-
C Category (Suburban station)	-	-
D Category	-	-
E Category	-	-
F Category; Halt Station	-	-
Total	-	-

Stations closed for Passengers -
