= Ganj Basoda railway station =

Railway station in Madhya Pradesh, India

Ganj Basoda
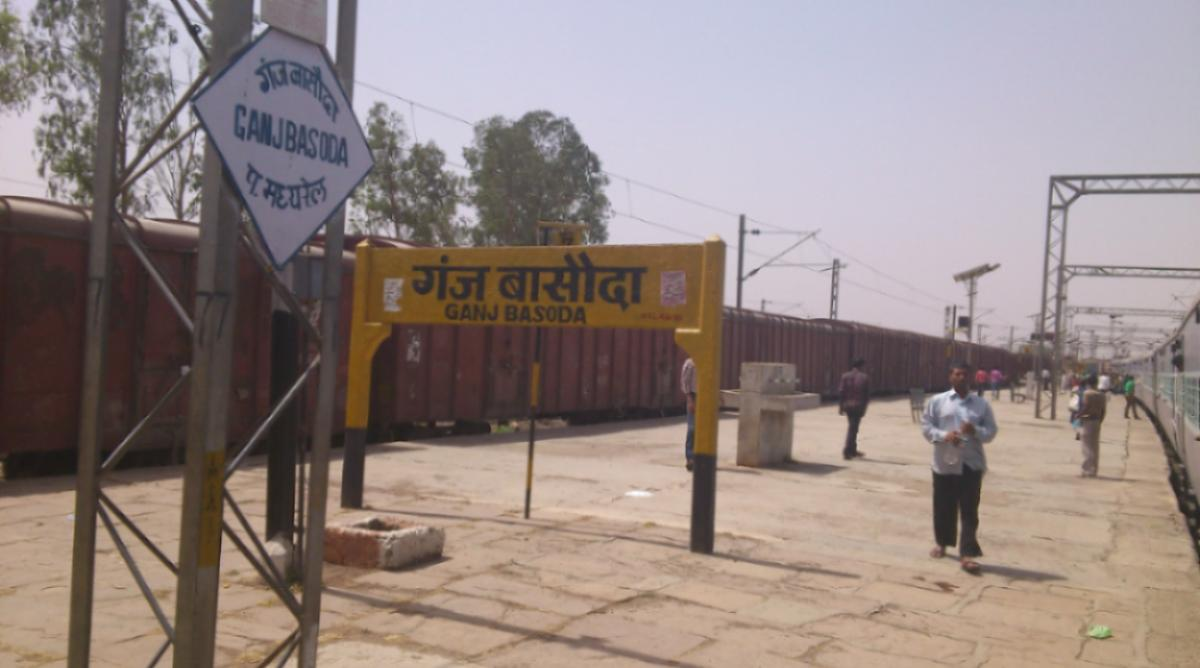
- Station platform board

General information
- Location: Ganj Basoda, Vidisha district, Madhya Pradesh; India
- Coordinates: 23.85°N 77.93°E
- Elevation: 417 metres (1,368 ft)
- System: Indian Railway Station
- Owner: Indian Railways
- Operator: West Central Railway
- Lines: Agra–Bhopal section New Delhi–Chennai main line
- Platforms: 4
- Tracks: 5

Construction
- Structure type: Standard (on ground station)
- Parking: Available

Other information
- Status: Functioning
- Station code: BAQ
- Zone(s): West Central Railway
- Division(s): Bhopal
Location
- Location within Madhya Pradesh Location within India

Ganj Basoda railway station is a railway station in Vidisha district of Madhya Pradesh. The station is located in the city of Ganj Basoda, situated on the New Delhi–Chennai main line. Its code is BAQ. It is connected to the major cities of India by the railway network.

Ganj Basoda is well connected to New Delhi, Bhopal, Varanasi, Jhansi, Mumbai, Chennai, Howrah, Gaya, Indore, Hyderabad, Jaipur, Jodhpur, Amritsar, Somnath, Kota, Jabalpur, Nagpur and Bilaspur.

== Structure ==
The railway station consists of four platforms. The platforms are well furnished and interconnect foot over bridges and it provides the following facilities:

- Gents waiting halls
- Ladies waiting halls
- Electronic Train Indicator
- Reserved computerised ticket counters
- Un-reserved computerised ticket counters
- Parking
