= Chunar Junction railway station =

Railway station of Uttar Pradesh, India

Chunar Junction

General information
- Location: Chunar, Mirzapur district, Uttar Pradesh; India
- Coordinates: 25°06′12″N 82°52′31″E
- Elevation: 85 metres (279 ft)
- System: Indian Railways junction station
- Owner: Indian Railways
- Operator: North Central Railway
- Lines: DDU–Kanpur, Chunar–Chopan
- Platforms: 5
- Tracks: 8

Construction
- Structure type: Standard on ground
- Parking: No
- Cycle facilities: No

Other information
- Status: Functioning
- Station code: CAR
- Zone(s): North Central Railway zone
- Division(s): Prayagraj

History
- Opened: 1864; 162 years ago
- Electrified: 1965–66
- Former names: East Indian Railway Company
Location
- Location within Uttar Pradesh

Chunar Junction railway station (station code:- CAR) is on the DDU–Kanpur section of the Howrah-New Delhi Main Line. A single electrified line goes for Chopan of the Sonbhadra district of Uttar Pradesh. It is located in Mirzapur district of the Indian state of Uttar Pradesh. It serves Chunar and the surrounding areas.

== History ==
The Howrah–Delhi line of East Indian Railway Company was ready up to Naini in 1864 and after the Old Naini Bridge was completed through trains started running in 1865–66.

The 79.07 km (49 mi)-long 5 ft 6 in (1,676 mm) broad gauge Chunar–Chopan line was constructed in 1954.

== Electrification ==
The Dagmagpur–Cheoki section was electrified in 1965–66.

Preceding station	Indian Railways	Following station
Kailahat towards ?	North Central Railway zone Mughalsarai–Kanpur section	Dagmagpur towards ?
Terminus	North Central Railway zone Chunar–Billibari branch line	Sakteshgarh towards ?
