= Beohari railway station =

Railway station in Madhya Pradesh, India

Beohari

General information
- Location: Beohari, Shahdol district, Madhya Pradesh; India
- Coordinates: 24°00′02″N 81°22′48″E
- Elevation: 400 metres (1,300 ft)
- System: Indian Railways station
- Owner: Indian Railways
- Operator: West Central Railway
- Platforms: 2
- Tracks: 2

Construction
- Structure type: Standard (on ground)
- Parking: Yes

Other information
- Status: Functioning
- Station code: BEHR
- Zone(s): West Central Railway
- Division(s): Jabalpur
Location
- Location within India Location within Madhya Pradesh

Beohari railway station is a railway station in Beohari town, Madhya Pradesh, India, with station code BEHR. The station has two platforms. Passenger, Express and Superfast trains halt there.
