= Chopan railway station =

Railway station in Uttar Pradesh

General information
- Location: State Highway 5A, Chopan, Sonbhadra, Uttar Pradesh; India
- Coordinates: 24.5135°N 83.0266°E
- Elevation: 194 metres (636 ft)
- System: Indian Railways station
- Owner: Indian Railways
- Operator: East Central Railway
- Platforms: 5
- Tracks: 8

Construction
- Structure type: Standard (on-ground station)
- Parking: Yes
- Cycle facilities: No
- Accessible: Yes

Other information
- Status: Functioning
- Station code: CPU
- Zone(s): East Central Railway
- Division(s): Dhanbad
Location
- Location within India Location within Uttar Pradesh

Chopan railway station (station code: CPU) is a major railway station located in the Sonbhadra district of the Indian state Uttar Pradesh which primarily serves Chopan town and its surrounding areas. The station consists of five platforms and the platforms are well sheltered and well equipped with all the basic amenities.

The station connects 'Sonbhadra district' to major cities such as Jammu, Amritsar, Jalandhar, Ludhiana, Chandigarh, New Delhi, Kanpur, Prayagraj, Varanasi, Lucknow, Bareilly, Pilibhit, Tanakpur, Dhanbad, Asansol, Howrah, Kolkata, Gaya, Patna, Ranchi, Jamshedpur, Kharagpur, Sambalpur, Jabalpur, Bhopal, Ujjain, Ajmer and Ahmedabad.

Ranchi Rajdhani Express, Jharkhand Swarna Jayanti Express, Muri Express, Shaktipunj Express and Triveni Express are some popular trains that halt at this station.
