= Bargawan railway station =

Train station in Madhya Pradesh, India

Bargawan Railway Station

General information
- Location: Bargawan, Singrauli, Madhya Pradesh 486892; India
- Coordinates: 24.1973°N 82.4563°E
- System: Indian railway station
- Owner: Indian Railways
- Operator: West Central Railway Zone
- Platforms: 2
- Tracks: 6
- Connections: Auto stand

Construction
- Structure type: Standard
- Parking: Yes
- Cycle facilities: No

Other information
- Status: functioning
- Station code: BRGW

Services
Passenger train, goods train
Location

Bargawan Railway Station is situated in Bargawan, Singrauli, Madhya Pradesh 486892, India, code BRGW . It does not have a train announcement system. It is owned by Indian Railways.
