= Khajuraho–Hazrat Nizamuddin Uttar Pradesh Sampark Kranti Express =

Train in India

Uttar Pradesh Sampark Kranti Link Express
Overview
- Service type: Sampark Kranti Express
- First service: 11 March 2005; 20 years ago
- Last service: Discontinued from 1 March 2010; 15 years ago
- Current operator: Northern Railway

Route
- Termini: Khajuraho (KURJ); Hazrat Nizamuddin (NZM)
- Stops: 7
- Distance travelled: 604 km (375 mi)
- Average journey time: 10 hrs 25 mins
- Service frequency: Daily
- Train number: 22447 / 22448

On-board services
- Classes: AC 2 tier, AC 3 tier, Sleeper Class, General Unreserved
- Seating arrangements: Yes
- Sleeping arrangements: Yes
- Catering facilities: On-board catering, E-catering
- Observation facilities: Large windows
- Baggage facilities: No
- Other facilities: Below the seats

Technical
- Rolling stock: ICF coach
- Track gauge: 1,676 mm (5 ft 6 in)
- Operating speed: 56 km/h (35 mph) average including halts.

The 22447 / 22448 Uttar Pradesh Sampark Kranti Link Express is a Superfast train belonging to Northern Railway zone that runs between Khajuraho and Hazrat Nizamuddin in India. It is currently being operated with 22447/22448 train numbers on a daily basis.

== Service ==
The 22447/Uttar Pradesh Sampark Kranti Express has an average speed of 55 km/h and covers 604 km in 11h 5m. The 22448/Uttar Pradesh Sampark Kranti Express has an average speed of 58 km/h and covers 604 km in 10h 25m.

This train is going to be replaced by 11841/11842 Gita Jayanti Express (extended with new number) from 27 April 2020 from Khajuraho to Kurukshetra Junction and from 28 April 2020 from Kurukshetra Junction to Khajuraho.

via:-

- Lalitpur Junction
- Jhansi Junction
- Gwalior Junction
- Mathura Junction
- Chata
- Palwal
- Hazrat Nizamuddin
- New Delhi
- Kurukshetra Junction
- Sonipat Junction

== Route & Halts ==
The train halts at following stations:

- Khajuraho
- Mahoba Junction
- Kulpahar
- Harpalpur
- Mauranipur
- Jhansi Junction
- Agra Cantonment
- Mathura Junction
- Hazrat Nizamuddin

== Coach composition ==
The train has standard ICF rakes with max speed of 110 kmph. The train consists of 10 coaches:

- 1 AC First class and AC II tier composite (HAE)
- 1 AC II Tier and AC III Tier composite (AB1)
- 1 AC III Tier (B2)
- 2 Sleeper coaches (S5, S6)
- 3 General Unreserved
- 2 Seating cum Luggage Rake

== Traction ==
The train is hauled by a Jhansi-based WDM-3A diesel locomotive from Khajuraho to Mahoba. At Mahoba it reverses direction and is hauled by Tughlakabad-based WAP-7 electric locomotive power the train for its reminder journey until Hazrat Nizamuddin.

== Rake sharing ==
No rake sharing arrangements.

== Direction reversal ==
The train reverses its direction once:

- Mahoba Junction

== See also ==
- Khajuraho railway station
- Hazrat Nizamuddin railway station
- Uttar Pradesh Sampark Kranti Express
