= Dr. Ambedkar Nagar–Prayagraj Express =

Train in India

Overview
- Service type: Express
- First service: 16 February 2019; 7 years ago
- Current operator: North Central Railway

Route
- Termini: Dr. Ambedkar Nagar (DADN); Prayagraj Junction (PRYJ)
- Stops: 18
- Distance travelled: 948 km (589 mi)
- Average journey time: 18 hrs 30 mins
- Service frequency: Daily (Note: Runs 7 days in a week for every direction.)
- Train number: 14115 / 14116

On-board services
- Classes: AC 2 Tier, AC 3 Tier, Sleeper Class, General Unreserved
- Seating arrangements: Yes
- Sleeping arrangements: Yes
- Catering facilities: On-board catering, E-catering
- Observation facilities: Large windows
- Baggage facilities: No
- Other facilities: Below the seats

Technical
- Rolling stock: LHB coach
- Track gauge: 1,676 mm (5 ft 6 in)
- Operating speed: 51 km/h (32 mph) average including halts.

The 14115 / 14116 Dr. Ambedkar Nagar–Prayagraj Express is an express train belonging to North Central Railway zone that runs between Dr. Ambedkar Nagar and Prayagraj Junction in India. It is currently being operated with 14115/14116 train numbers on Daily basis.

This train was previously running between Indore Junction and Khajuraho as Indore–Khajuraho Express. In 2020, Western Railway Zone of Indian Railways extended the services of express train running between Indore to Khajuraho, to Prayagraj and Dr. Ambedkar Nagar.

== Coach composition ==
The train has LHB rakes with max speed of 110 kmph. The train consists of 20 coaches :

- 2 AC II Tier
- 3 AC III Tier
- 9 Sleeper coaches
- 4 General Unreserved
- 2 Seating cum Luggage Rake

== Service ==
14115/ Dr. Ambedkar Nagar–Prayagraj Express has an average speed of 51 km/h and covers 948 km in 18 hrs 45 mins.

The 14116/ Prayagraj–Dr. Ambedkar Nagar Express has an average speed of 51 km/h and covers 948 km in 18 hrs 25 mins.

== Route and halts ==
The important halts of the train are:

- Dr. Ambedkar Nagar
- Indore Junction
- Ujjain Junction
- Sant Hirdaram Nagar
- Sanchi
- Vidisha
- Bina Junction
- Lalitpur Junction
- Tikamgarh
- Khargapur
- Chhatarpur
- Khajuraho
- Mahoba Junction
- Banda
- Chitrakutdham Karwi
- Manikpur Junction
- Prayagraj Junction

== Schedule ==
Train number	Station code	Departure station	Departure time	Departure day	Arrival station	Arrival time	Arrival day
14115	DADN	Dr. Ambedkar Nagar	11:15 AM	Sun, Mon, Tue, Wed, Thu, Fri, Sat	Prayagraj Junction	06:00 AM	Mon, Tue, Wed, Thu, Fri, Sat
14116	PRYJ	Prayagraj Junction	15:20 PM	Sun, Mon, Tue, Wed, Thu, Fri, Sat	Dr. Ambedkar Naga	09:45 AM	Mon, Tue, Wed, Thu, Fri, Sat, Sun

== Traction ==
Both trains are hauled by a Kanpur Loco Shed-based WAP-7 electric locomotive from end to end.
