= Banaras–Khajuraho Vande Bharat Express =

Mini Vande Bharat Express train route in India

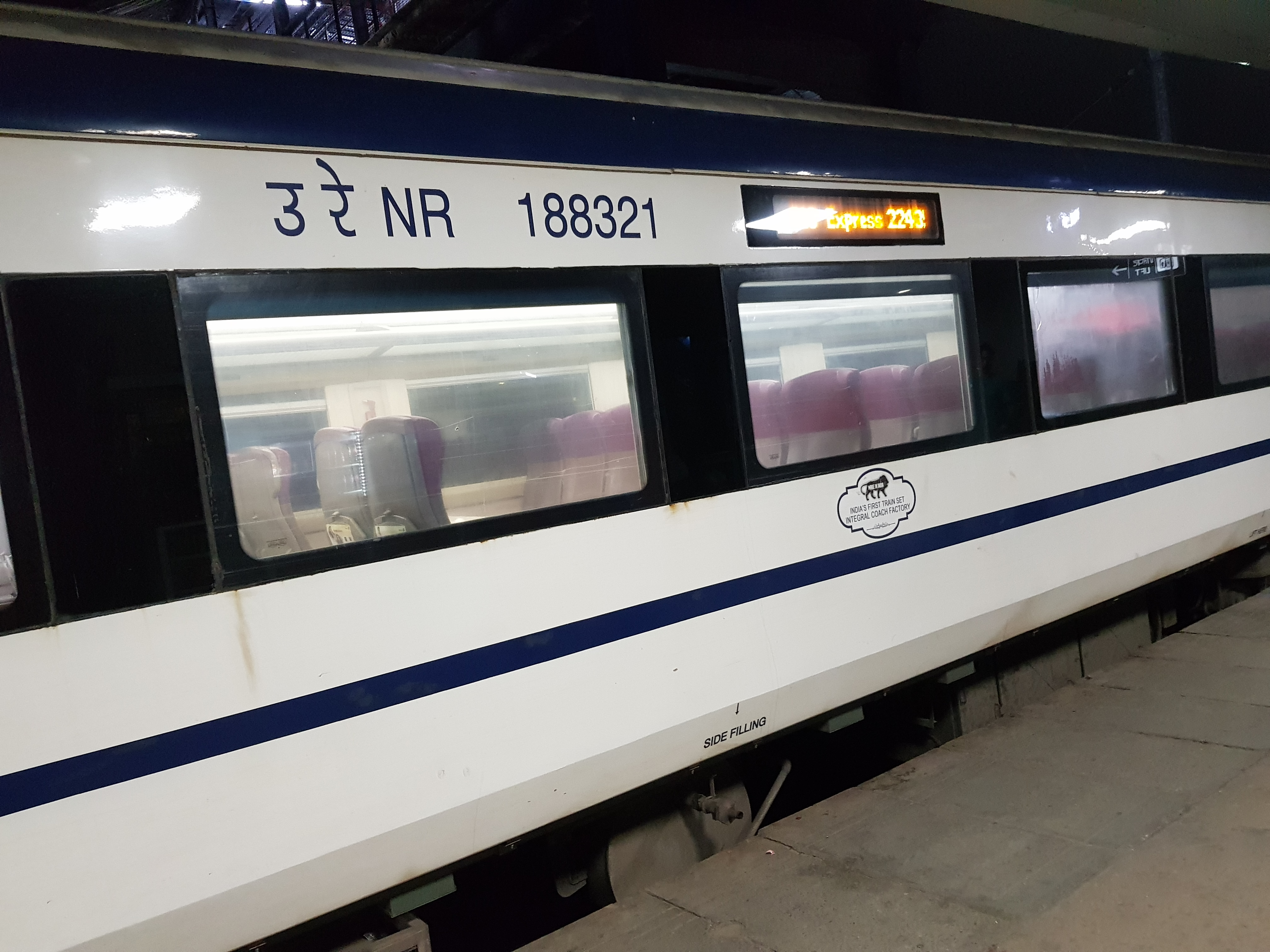
- Banaras–Khajuraho Vande Bharat Express At Mahoba Junction railway station

Overview
- Service type: Vande Bharat Express
- Locale: Uttar Pradesh and Madhya Pradesh
- First service: 8 November 2025 (Inaugural); 11 November 2025; 11 months ago (Commercial)
- Current operator: North Eastern Railways (NER)

Route
- Termini: Banaras (BSBS); Khajuraho (KURJ)
- Stops: 05
- Distance travelled: 465 km (289 mi)
- Average journey time: 07 hrs 50 mins
- Service frequency: Six days a week (Note: Except Thursdays)
- Train number: 26506 / 26505
- Line used: (TBC)

On-board services
- Classes: AC Chair Car, AC Executive Chair Car
- Seating arrangements: Airline style; Rotatable seats
- Sleeping arrangements: No
- Catering facilities: On board Catering
- Observation facilities: Large windows in all coaches
- Entertainment facilities: On-board WiFi; Infotainment system; Electric outlets; Reading light; Seat pockets; Bottle holder; Tray table
- Baggage facilities: Overhead racks
- Other facilities: Kavach

Technical
- Rolling stock: Mini Vande Bharat 2.0
- Track gauge: Indian gauge
- Electrification: 25 kV 50 Hz AC overhead line
- Operating speed: 60 km/h (37 mph) (Avg.)
- Average length: 192 metres (630 ft) (08 coaches)
- Track owner: Indian Railways
- Rake maintenance: Banaras (BSBS)

The 26506/26505 Banaras–Khajuraho Vande Bharat Express is India's 77th Vande Bharat Express train, connecting the Ganges city of Uttar Pradesh, Varanasi with the Chhatarpur district city, Khajuraho in Madhya Pradesh, India.

This express train was inaugurated by the Prime Minister Narendra Modi on November 8, 2025, from the Ganges metropolitan city of Uttar Pradesh, Varanasi.

== Overview ==
This train is currently operated by Indian Railways, connecting Banaras, Vindhyachal, Prayagraj Chheoki Junction, Chitrakutdham Karwi, Banda, Mahoba Junction and Khajuraho Jn. It is currently operated with train numbers 26506/26505 on 6 days a week basis.

== Rakes ==
It is the seventy-first 2nd Generation Mini Vande Bharat 2.0 Express train which was designed and manufactured by the Integral Coach Factory at Perambur, Chennai under the Make in India initiative.

== Service ==
The 26506/26505 Banaras–Khajuraho Vande Bharat Express currently operate 6 days a week, covering a distance of 465 km (289 mi) in a travel time of 07hrs 40mins with average speed of 61 km/h. The Maximum Permissible Speed (MPS) will be confirmed after commercial run.

== See also ==
- Vande Bharat Express
- Tejas Express
- Gatiman Express
- Banaras railway station
- Khajuraho railway station
