= Uttar Pradesh Sampark Kranti Express =

Train in India

Uttar Pradesh Sampark Kranti SuperFast Express
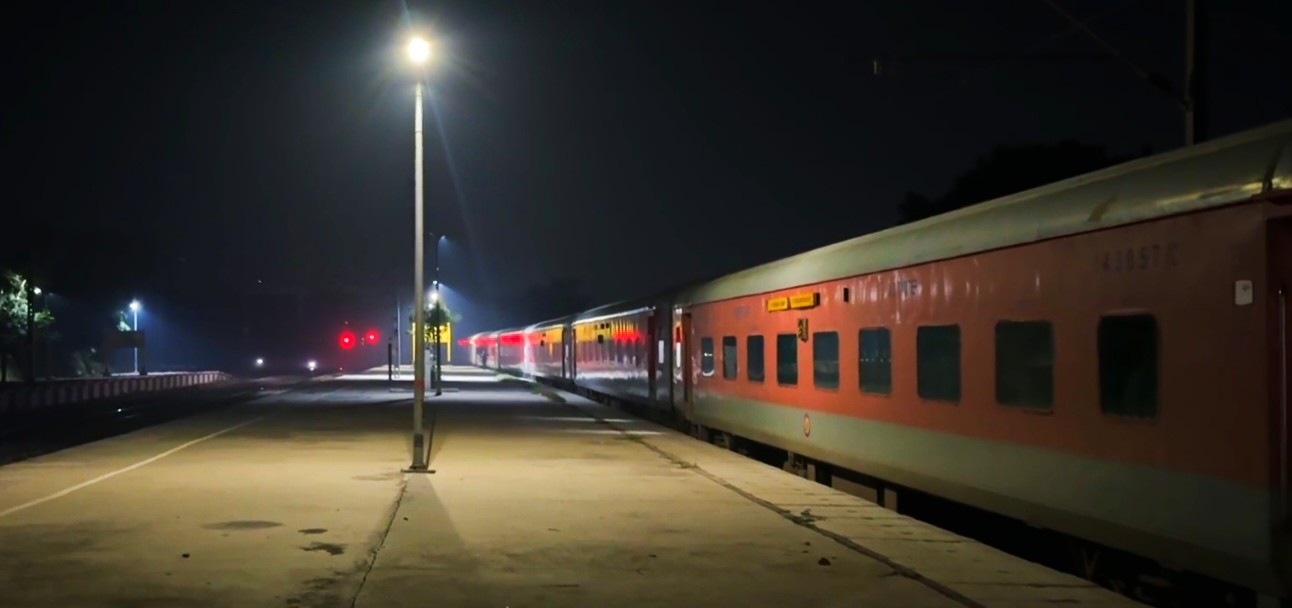
- Uttar Pradesh Sampark Kranti Express At Mathura Junction railway station

Overview
- Service type: Sampark Kranti Express
- Status: Operating
- First service: 11 March 2005; 20 years ago
- Current operator: Northern Railway

Route
- Termini: Manikpur Junction (MKP); Hazrat Nizamuddin (NZM)
- Stops: 10
- Distance travelled: 695 km (432 mi)
- Average journey time: 12 hours 25 minutes
- Service frequency: Daily
- Train number: 12447 / 12448

On-board services
- Classes: AC First Class, AC 2 tier, AC 3 tier, Sleeper class, General Unreserved
- Seating arrangements: Yes
- Sleeping arrangements: Yes
- Catering facilities: On-board catering, E-catering
- Observation facilities: Large windows
- Baggage facilities: Available

Technical
- Rolling stock: LHB coach
- Track gauge: 1,676 mm (5 ft 6 in)
- Electrification: Fully Electrified
- Operating speed: 66 km/h (41 mph) average with halts.

The 12447 / 12448 Uttar Pradesh Sampark Kranti Express is a Superfast Express train of the Sampark Kranti Express Category series belonging to Indian Railways – Northern Railway zone that runs between Manikpur Junction and Hazrat Nizamuddin in India.

It operates as train number 12447 from Manikpur Junction to Hazrat Nizamuddin and as train number 12448 in the reverse direction, serving the states of Delhi, Madhya Pradesh & Uttar Pradesh.

This train was introduced in the interim budget of 2004 / 05 by the then Railway Minister of India Mr. Nitesh Kumar.

== Coaches ==
Since October 2020 it's running as with brand new LHB coach and the coach composition is as follows:-

- 1 AC First class cum AC Second tier (HA1)
- 2 AC Second tier
- 4 AC third tier
- 2 AC third tier economy
- 6 Sleeper class
- 5 Second sitting (General class)
- 1 second sitting cum luggage
- 1 power car (HOG)

== Service ==
The 12447(02447) Manikpur–Hazrat Nizamuddin Uttar Pradesh Sampark Kranti Express covers the distance of 695 km (432 mi) in 10 hours 45 mins (66.50 km/h) and in 11 hours 30 mins as 12448 Hazrat Nizamuddin–Manikpur Uttar Pradesh Sampark Kranti Express (61.50 km/h).

As the average speed of the train is above 55 km/h (34 mph), as per Indian Railways rules, its fare includes a Superfast surcharge.

== Timing ==
WEF 22 February 2021 train number 12448 Hazrat Nizamuddin 20:00, Jhansi Junction 01:20-01:28, Manikpur 07:30

WEF 23 February 2021 train number 12447 Manikpur 18:25, Jhansi Junction 23:25-23:30, Hazrat Nizamuddin 05:22

== Traction ==
It is hauled by a Ghaziabad Loco Shed-based WAP-5 or Tughlakabad Loco Shed-based WAP-7 electric locomotive from end to end.

== Routeing ==
Following are the stoppages of this train:-

- Manikpur Junction
- Chitrakutdham Karwi
- Atarra
- Banda
- Mahoba Junction
- Kulpahar
- Harpalpur
- Mauranipur
- Jhansi Junction
- Agra Cantonment
- Mathura Junction
- Hazrat Nizamuddin

== Rake sharing ==
No rake sharing. 2 dedicated rakes.

== See also ==
- Manikpur Junction railway station
- Hazrat Nizamuddin railway station
- Khajuraho–Hazrat Nizamuddin Uttar Pradesh Sampark Kranti Express
