= Khargapur railway station =

Railway station in Madhya Pradesh, India

Khargapur

General information
- Location: Khargapur, Tikamgarh district, Madhya Pradesh; India
- Coordinates: 24°50′46″N 79°11′04″E
- Elevation: 291 metres (955 ft)
- System: Indian Railway Station
- Owner: Indian Railways
- Operator: North Central Railway
- Line: Lalipur - Khajuraho Line
- Platforms: 1

Construction
- Structure type: Standard on ground
- Parking: Yes
- Cycle facilities: No

Other information
- Status: Functioning
- Station code: KHGP
- Zone(s): North Central Railway
- Division(s): Jhansi
Location
- Location within India Location within Madhya Pradesh

Khargapur railway station is located in Tikamgarh district of Madhya Pradesh and serves Khargapur town. Its code is "KHGP". Passenger, Express, and Superfast trains halt here.

== Trains ==
The following trains halt at Khargapur railway station in both directions:

- Dr. Ambedkar Nagar - Prayagraj Express
- Bhopal - Khajuraho Mahamana Superfast Express
- Khajuraho - Jhansi Passenger
