= Hazrat Nizamuddin–Khajuraho Vande Bharat Express =

Mini Vande Bharat Express train route in India

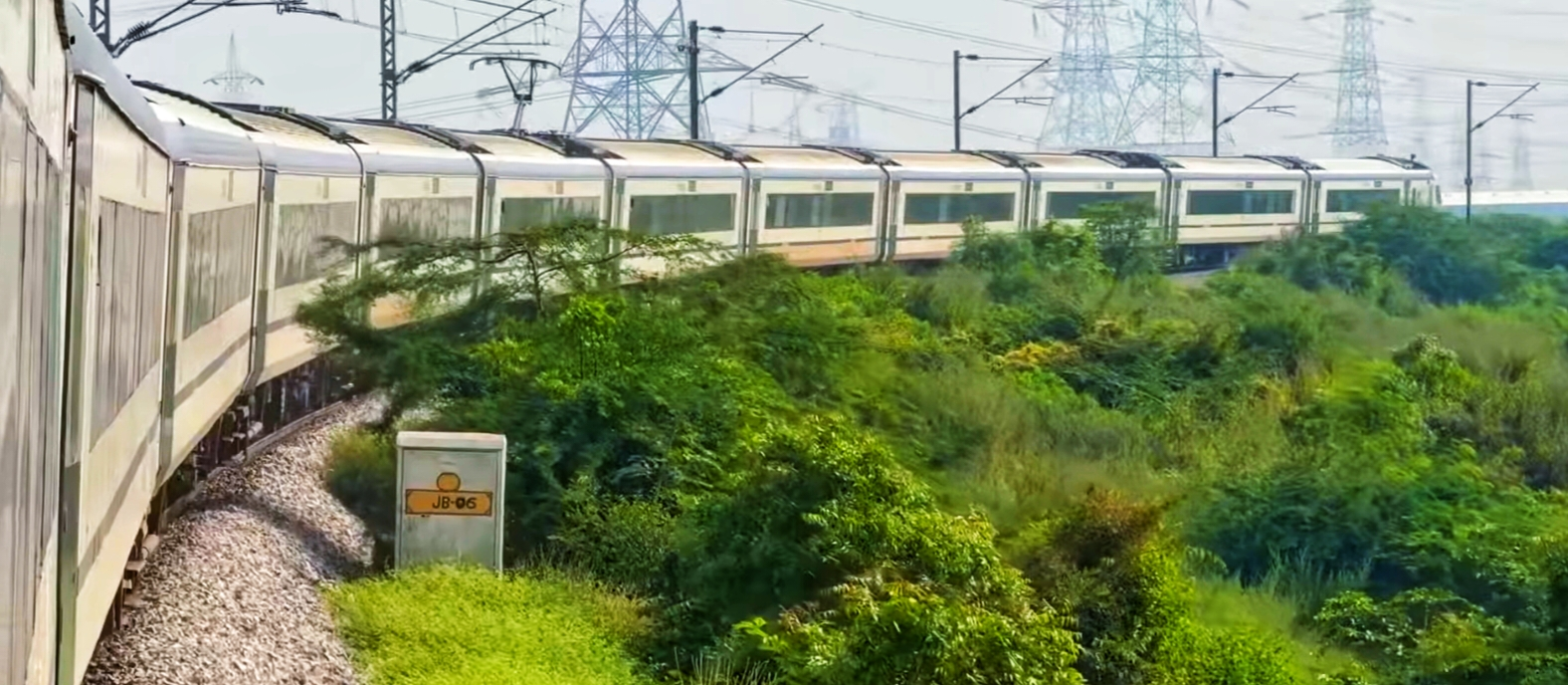
- Hazrat Nizamuddin–Khajuraho Vande Bharat Express approaching the Gwalior Junction

Overview
- Service type: Vande Bharat Express
- Locale: New Delhi, Haryana, Uttar Pradesh Rajasthan and Madhya Pradesh
- First service: 12 March 2024 (Inaugural); 15 March 2024; 2 years ago (Commercial)
- Current operator: Northern Railways (NR)

Route
- Termini: Hazrat Nizamuddin (NZM); Khajuraho Junction (KURJ)
- Stops: Agra Cantt, Gwalior Junction, Datia, Jhansi, Lalitpur, Chhatarpur
- Distance travelled: 660 km (410 mi)
- Average journey time: 08 hrs 20 mins
- Service frequency: Six days a week (Note: Except Mondays)
- Train number: 22470 / 22469
- Lines used: Delhi–Gwalior–Bhopal section (till Lalitpur Jn); Lalitpur–Khajuraho line

On-board services
- Classes: AC Chair Car, AC Executive Chair Car
- Seating arrangements: Airline style; Rotatable seats
- Sleeping arrangements: No
- Catering facilities: On board Catering
- Observation facilities: Large windows in all coaches
- Entertainment facilities: On-board WiFi; Infotainment System; Electric outlets; Reading light; Seat Pockets; Bottle Holder; Tray Table
- Baggage facilities: Overhead racks
- Other facilities: Kavach

Technical
- Rolling stock: Mini Vande Bharat 2.0 (Last service: May 15 2025); Vande Bharat 3.0 (First service: May 16 2025)
- Track gauge: Indian gauge 1,676 mm (5 ft 6 in) broad gauge
- Electrification: 25 kV 50 Hz AC Overhead line
- Operating speed: 160 km/h (99 mph)
- Average length: 384 metres (1,260 ft) (16 coaches)
- Track owner: Indian Railways
- Rake maintenance: (TBC)

The 22470/22469 Hazrat Nizamuddin–Khajuraho Vande Bharat Express is India's 47th Vande Bharat Express train, connecting the capital city of India, New Delhi with the Chhatarpur in Madhya Pradesh. This express train was inaugurated by Prime Minister Narendra Modi via video conferencing from Ahmedabad on 12 March 2024.

== Overview ==
This train is operated by Indian Railways, connecting Hazrat Nizamuddin, Agra Cantt, Gwalior Jn, Datia, Virangana Lakshmibai Jhansi Jn, Lalitpur Jn, Tikamgarh, Chhatarpur and Khajuraho Jn. It is operated with train numbers 22470/22469 on 6 days a week basis.

== Rakes ==
It is the forty-fifth 2nd Generation and thirtieth Mini Vande Bharat 2.0 Express train which was designed and manufactured by the Integral Coach Factory at Perambur, Chennai under the Make in India Initiative.

=== Coach augmentation ===
As per latest updates, this express train was augmented with 8 additional AC coaches, thereby running with Vande Bharat 3.0 trainset W.E.F. 16 May 2025 in order to enhance passenger capacity on this popular route.

== Service ==
The 22470/22469 Hazrat Nizamuddin - Khajuraho Jn Vande Bharat Express operates six days a week except Mondays, covering a distance of 660 km (410 mi) in a travel time of 8 hours with an average speed of 79 km/h (49 mph). The service has 7 intermediate stops. The Maximum Permissible Speed is 130 km/h (81 mph).

== See also ==
- Vande Bharat Express
- Tejas Express
- Gatimaan Express
- Hazrat Nizamuddin railway station
- Khajuraho railway station
