= Gita Jayanti Express =

Train in India

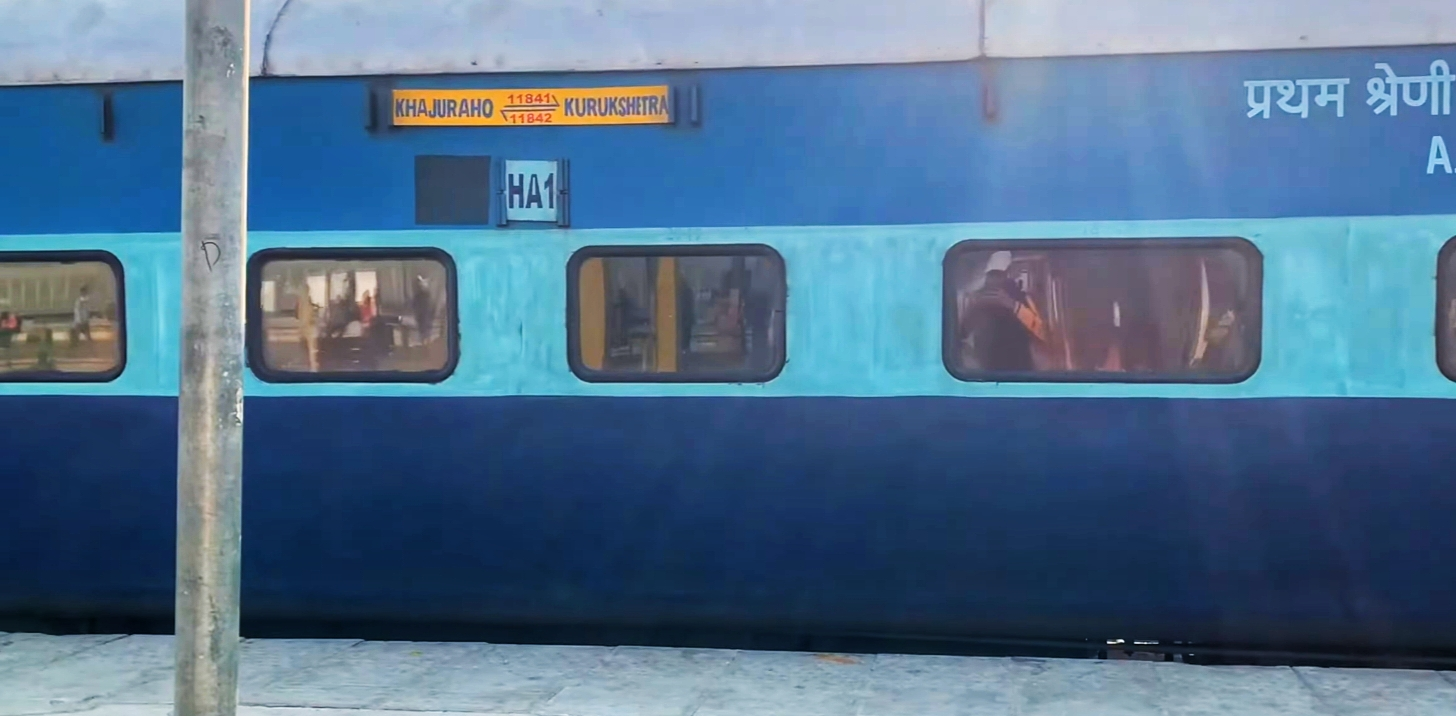
- Geeta Jayanti Express at Kurukshetra Jn.

Overview
- Service type: Express
- First service: 9 December 2016; 9 years ago
- Current operator: North Central Railway

Route
- Termini: Khajuraho (KURJ); Kurukshetra (KKDE)
- Stops: 24
- Distance travelled: 824 km (512 mi)
- Average journey time: 17 hours 30 minutes
- Service frequency: Daily
- Train number: 11841 / 11842

On-board services
- Classes: General Unreserved, Sleeper Class, AC 3 Tier, AC 2 Tier, AC First Class
- Seating arrangements: No
- Sleeping arrangements: Yes
- Catering facilities: On-board catering, E-catering
- Observation facilities: Large windows
- Baggage facilities: Available
- Other facilities: Below the seats

Technical
- Rolling stock: LHB coach
- Track gauge: 1,676 mm (5 ft 6 in)
- Operating speed: 48 km/h (30 mph) average including halts.

The 11841 / 11842 Gita Jayanti Express is an express train of the Indian Railways connecting Khajuraho in Madhya Pradesh and Kurukshetra Junction of Haryana. It is currently being operated with 11841/11842 train numbers on a daily basis. The train undergoes rake reversal at Lalitpur Junction.

== Service ==
The 11841/Gita Jayanti Express has an average speed of 46 km/h and covers 824 km in 18 hrs 5 mins. 11842/Gita Jayanti Express has an average speed of 48 km/h and 824 km in 17 hrs 5 mins.

== Route and halts ==
The important halts of the train are:

- Khajuraho
- Maharaja Chhatrasal Station Chhatarpur
- Tikamgarh
- Lalitpur Junction
- Jhansi Junction
- Gwalior Junction
- Agra Cantonment
- Mathura Junction
- Palwal
- Faridabad
- Hazrat Nizamuddin
- New Delhi
- Sonipat Junction
- Panipat Junction
- Kurukshetra Junction

== Coach composition ==
The train has LHB rakes with max speed of 130 kmph. The train consists of 22 coaches:

- 1 AC First Class
- 2 AC 2 Tier
- 4 AC 3 Tier
- 6 Sleeper class
- 7 General
- 2 Second-class Luggage/parcel van

== Traction ==
Both trains are hauled by a Ghaziabad Loco Shed-based WAP-7 electric locomotive.
