= Mahakoshal Express =

Train in India

Mahakoshal Superfast Express

Overview
- Service type: Superfast Express
- Locale: Madhya Pradesh, Rajasthan, Uttar Pradesh, Haryana & Delhi
- First service: 1 October 1976; 48 years ago
- Current operator(s): West Central Railway

Route
- Termini: Jabalpur Junction (JBP); Hazrat Nizamuddin (NZM)
- Stops: 27
- Distance travelled: 957 km (595 mi)
- Average journey time: 16 hours 50 minutes
- Service frequency: Daily
- Train number(s): 12189 / 12190

On-board services
- Class(es): AC First, AC 2 Tier, AC 3 Tier, Sleeper Class, General Unreserved
- Seating arrangements: Yes
- Sleeping arrangements: Yes
- Catering facilities: On-board catering, E-catering
- Observation facilities: Large windows
- Baggage facilities: Available
- Other facilities: Below the seats

Technical
- Rolling stock: LHB coach
- Track gauge: 1,676 mm (5 ft 6 in)
- Operating speed: 57 km/h (35 mph) average including halts.

The 12189 / 12190 Mahakoshal Express is a superfast express train of the Indian Railways, which runs between Jabalpur Junction railway station of Jabalpur, one of the important cities and military cantonment hub of the Central Indian state Madhya Pradesh and Hazrat Nizamuddin railway station of Delhi, the capital city of India.

The name "Mahakoshal Express" has been given as the city of Jabalpur is located on the region of Mahakoshal, hence the name.

== Arrival and departure ==
- Train no.12189 departs from Jabalpur daily at 18:10 hrs, reaching Hazrat Nizamuddin railway station of Delhi the next day at 11:35 hrs.
- Train no.12190 departs from Hazrat Nizamuddin railway station of Delhi, daily at 16:10 hrs, reaching Jabalpur the next day at 09:35 hrs.

== Route and halts ==
The important halts of the train are:

- Jabalpur Junction
- Katni Junction
- Maihar
- Satna
- Chitrakutdham Karwi
- Banda
- Mahoba Junction
- Jhansi Junction
- Gwalior Junction
- Dholpur
- Agra Cantt.
- Mathura Junction
- Ballabhgarh
- Hazrat Nizamuddin.

== Coach composition ==
The train consists of 21 coaches:

- 1 AC I tier
- 2 AC II tier
- 5 AC III tier
- 9 sleeper coaches
- 2 un-reserved
- 2 Power car

== Average speed and frequency ==
The train runs with an average speed of 55 km/h. The train runs on a daily basis.

== Traction ==
Both train are hauled by a Tughlakabad Loco Shed based WAP-7 electric locomotive from Hazrat Nizamuddin to Jabalpur Junction Junction and vice versa.

== Rake maintenance ==
The train is maintained by the Jabalpur Coaching Depot.

== See also ==
- Dayodaya Express
- Jabalpur Junction
- Bhopal Junction
