= Ambikeshwar railway station =

Railway station in Madhya Pradesh, India

General information
- Location: State Highway 2, Madhya Pradesh; India
- Coordinates: 26.3659°N 77.9726°E
- Elevation: 196 metres (643 ft)
- System: Indian Railways station
- Owner: Indian Railways
- Operator: North Central Railway
- Line: Gwalior Light Railway
- Platforms: 1
- Tracks: 2
- Connections: Auto stand

Construction
- Structure type: Standard (on-ground station)
- Parking: No
- Cycle facilities: No

Other information
- Status: Functioning
- Station code: ABE
- Zone(s): North Central Railway
- Division(s): Jhansi

History
- Opened: 1904
Location

Ambikeshwar railway station is a small railway station in Gwalior district, Madhya Pradesh. Its code is ABE. It serves Ambikeshwar village. The station consists of a single platform. The platform is not well sheltered. It lacks many facilities including water and sanitation.

The station lies on Gwalior Light Railway track which starts from Gwalior railway narrow-gauge station to Sheopur in Madhya Pradesh. The line was started in 1904 by Maharaja Madho Rao Scindia of Gwalior.

== Major trains ==
Some of the important trains that runs from Ambikeshwar are :

- Gwalior Sheopur NG Passenger
- Sabalgarh Gwalior NG Passenger
