= Tikamgarh railway station =

Railway station in Madhya Pradesh, India

Tikamgarh
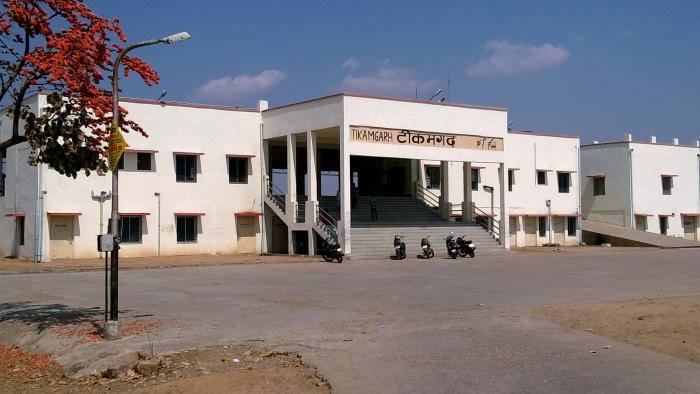
- Tikamgarh Railway Station

General information
- Location: Jhansi Road, Tikamgarh; India
- Coordinates: 24°46′00″N 78°50′25″E
- Elevation: 349 metres (1,145 ft)
- System: Indian Railways Station
- Owner: Indian Railways
- Operator: North Central Railway
- Line: Lalitpur–Khajuraho line
- Platforms: 1
- Tracks: 4

Construction
- Structure type: Standard (on ground)
- Parking: Yes

Other information
- Status: Functioning
- Station code: TKMG
- Zone(s): North Central Railway
- Division(s): Jhansi

History
- Opened: 2013
Location
- Location within India Location within Madhya Pradesh

Tikamgarh Railway Station is located in Tikamgarh district of Madhya Pradesh and serves Tikamgarh town. Its code is "TKMG". Passenger, Express and Superfast trains halt here.

== Major trains ==
Following trains halt at Tikamgarh railway station in both directions:

- Hazrat Nizamuddin–Khajuraho Vande Bharat Express
- Bhopal–Khajuraho Mahamana Superfast Express
- Khajuraho–Udaipur City Express
- Khajuraho–Kurukshetra Express
- Prayagraj–Dr.Ambedkarnagar Express
