= Sangita Mukhopadhyay =

Indian molecular biologist

- Born: 1 January 1966 (age 60); Khargapur, Madhya Pradesh, India
- Education: Regional Medical Research Centre, Bhubaneswar; Utkal University; National Institute of Immunology; University of Texas Health Science Center at Houston
- Known for: Studies on immunosuppression
- Awards: 1993 Jawaharlal Nehru Memorial Fund Award; 1996 IIS Apeeza Trust Award; 2003 DST Young Scientist Award; 2003 Third World Women Scientist Grant Award; 2004 ISCA Young Women Bioscientist Award; 2007 DBT National Young Woman Bioscientist Award; 2008 N-BIOS Prize; 2008 Woman Bioscientist Award; 2011 ICMR Basanti Devi Amir Chand Prize; 2015 ICMR Chaturvedi Ghanshyam Das Jaigopal Memorial Award
- Scientific career
- Fields: Cell biology; Immunology
- Workplaces: Central Drug Research Institute; Centre for DNA Fingerprinting and Diagnostics

Sangita Mukhopadhyay (born 1 January 1966) is an Indian molecular cell biologist, immunologist and the head of the molecular biology group at the Centre for DNA Fingerprinting and Diagnostics. Known for her studies on immunosuppression and infection biology, Mukhopadhyay is an elected fellow of all the three major Indian science academies namely the Indian National Science Academy, the Indian Academy of Sciences and the National Academy of Sciences, India. The Department of Biotechnology of the Government of India awarded her the National Bioscience Award for Career Development, one of the highest Indian science awards, for her contributions to biosciences in 2008.

== Biography ==
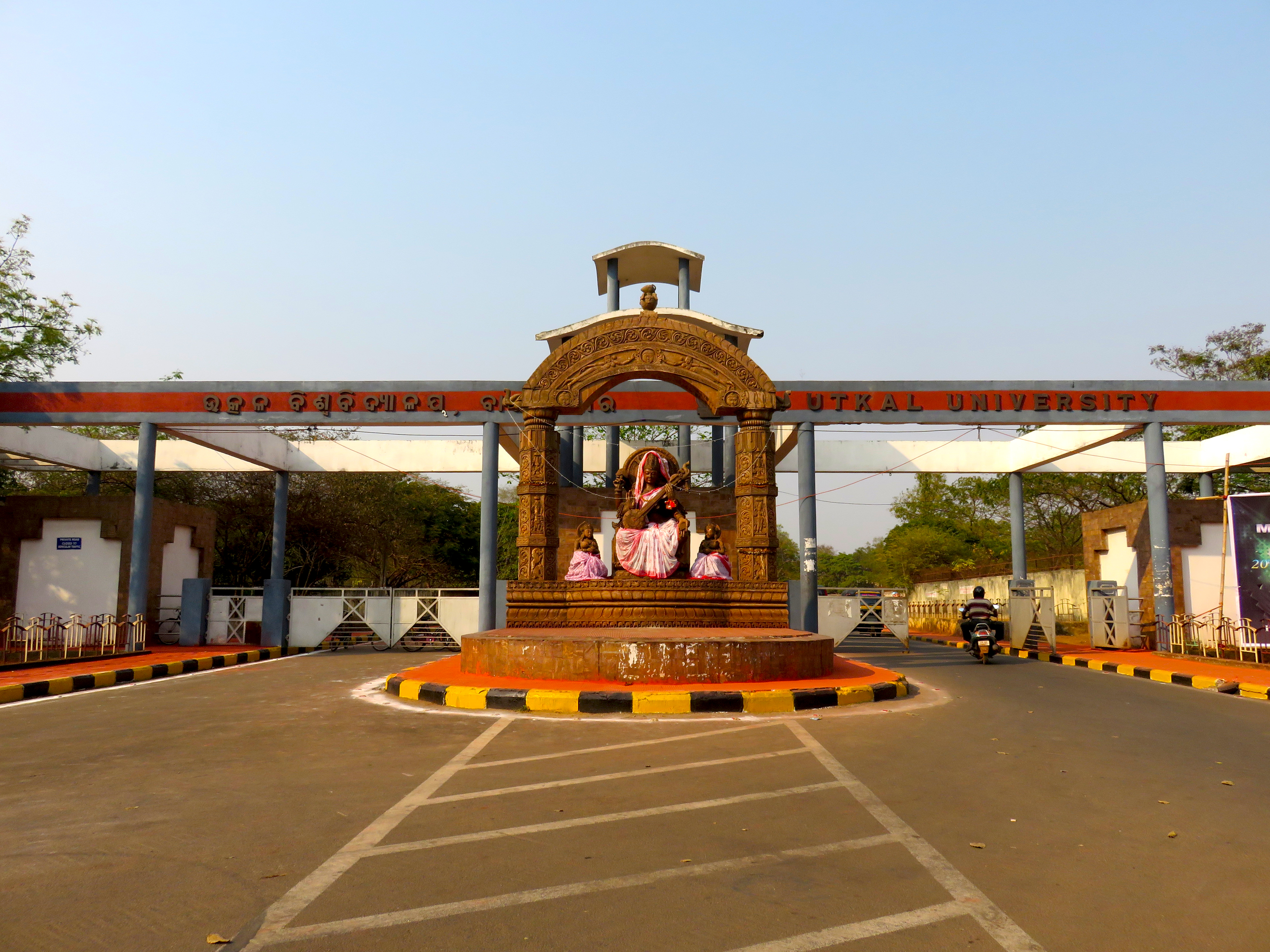
Utkal University - main gate

Born on the New Year's Day of 1966 at Khargapur in the Indian state of Madhya Pradesh, Sangita Mukhopadhyay completed her MSc with a gold medal and did her doctoral studies at the Regional Medical Research Centre, Bhubaneswar which fetched her a Phd from Utkal University in 1998 for her thesis on immunoregulation in filariasis. Subsequently, she did the post-doctoral work at the National Institute of Immunology and, later, in U.S.A. at the University of Texas Health Science Center at Houston. On her return to India, she joined the Central Drug Research Institute in 1999 and after a short stint, moved to the Centre for DNA Fingerprinting and Diagnostics (CDFD). She later became the head of the Molecular Biology Group at the Laboratory of Molecular and Cellular Biology of the institute and holds the position of a Grade IV staff scientist. At her laboratory, she hosts many research scholars who are involved in the studies in the disciplines of cell signaling and signal transduction, immunity, macrophage biology and tuberculosis.

Mukhopadhyay resides at Jamia Osmania, a suburb of Hyderabad in Telangana.

== Legacy ==
CDC Tuberculosis (TB) Transmission and Pathogenesis Video

Mukhopadhyay's research focus is on the molecular study of the immune responses signaling networks caused by the pathogens. During her post-doctoral days, she worked on the immunological studies of macrophage signaling pathways and regulation of T cell functions and elucidated how the macrophage effector-APC functions were affected by the enzyme, bruton's tyrosine kinase (Btk). Later, concentrating on the pathogenesis of tuberculosis, she identified several PE/PPE family proteins of Mycobacterium tuberculosis, the causative pathogen of tuberculosis, and described the roles of two such proteins; her findings have reportedly assisted in developing new diagnostic tools, drug targets and therapeutic protocols. Her studies have been documented by way of a number of articles (Note: Please see Selected bibliography section) and ResearchGate, an online repository of scientific articles has listed 45 of them. Besides, she has also contributed chapters to books published by others.

Mukhopadhyay is a member of the Task Force on Infectious Disease Biology of the Department of Biotechnology of India and is a life member of the Indian Immunology Society, the Molecular Immunology Forum, India and the Indian Science Congress Association. She has undertaken several research projects for agencies such as the Department of Biotechnology of India, the Indian Council of Medical Research, the Department of Science and Technology and The World Academy of Sciences. She has also served as a reviewer for various journals including BMC Hematology, a BioMed Central publication.

== Awards and honors ==
Jawahralal Nehru Memorial Fund Award in 1993 for academic excellence and the Apeeza Trust Award of the Indian Immunology Society in 1996. She has received two Young Scientist Awards, the Best Best Young Scientist Award of the Indian Immunology Society in 1997 and the Young Scientist Award of the Department of Science and Technology in 2003. The next year, she received the 2004 Young Women Bioscientist of Promise Award of the Indian Science Congress Association. The Department of Biotechnology (DBT) of the Government of India awarded her the National Young Woman Bioscientist Award in 2007 and a year later, DBT honored her again with the National Bioscience Award for Career Development, one of the highest Indian science awards in 2008. She has received two awards from the Indian Council of Medical Research; the Basanti Devi Amir Chand Prize in 2011 and the Chaturvedi Ghanshyam Das Jaigopal Memorial Award in 2015.

The National Academy of Sciences, India elected her as a fellow in 2010 and she received the elected fellowship of the Indian Academy of Sciences in 2013. In 2016, the Indian National Science Academy also elected her as a fellow. She is also an elected fellow of the American Society of Hematology and the American Association of Immunologists and a former overseas associate of the Department of Biotechnology (2005). The award orations delivered by her include the Kanishka Oration of the Indian Council of Medical Research. She is also a recipient of the women scientist research grant of The World Academy of Sciences which she received in 2003.

== Selected bibliography ==
- Bhat, Khalid Hussain; Mukhopadhyay, Sangita (1 May 2015). "Macrophage takeover and the host–bacilli interplay during tuberculosis". Future Microbiology. 10 (5): 853–872. doi:10.2217/fmb.15.11. ISSN 1746-0913. PMID 26000654.
- Mukhopadhyay, Sangita; Nair, Shiny; Ghosh, Sudip (1 March 2012). "Pathogenesis in tuberculosis: transcriptomic approaches to unraveling virulence mechanisms and finding new drug targets". FEMS Microbiology Reviews. 36 (2): 463–485. doi:10.1111/j.1574-6976.2011.00302.x. ISSN 0168-6445. PMID 22092372.
- Mukhopadhyay, Sangita; Balaji, Kithiganahalli Narayanaswamy (2011). "The PE and PPE proteins of Mycobacterium tuberculosis". Tuberculosis. 91 (5): 441–447. doi:10.1016/j.tube.2011.04.004. PMID 21527209.

== See also ==
- Mycobacterium tuberculosis
- Macrophage
