= Maharaja Chhatrasal Station Chhatarpur railway station =

Railway station in Madhya Pradesh, India

Maharaja Chhatrasal Station Chhatarpur

General information
- Location: Chhatarpur, Chhatarpur district, Madhya Pradesh; India
- Coordinates: 24°52′41″N 79°36′55″E
- Elevation: 307 metres (1,007 ft)
- System: Indian Railway Station
- Owner: Indian Railways
- Operator: North Central Railway zone
- Line: Lalitpur - Singrauli Line
- Platforms: 3
- Tracks: 4

Construction
- Structure type: Standard on ground
- Parking: Yes
- Cycle facilities: Yes

Other information
- Status: Functioning
- Station code: MCSC

History
- Opened: 2016

Passengers
- 30000
Location
- Location within India Location within Madhya Pradesh

Maharaja Chhatrasal Station Chhatarpur railway station is located in Chhatarpur district of Madhya Pradesh and serves Chhatarpur city. Its code is "MCSC". Passenger, Express, and Superfast trains halt here.

== Trains ==
The following trains halt at Maharaja Chhatrasal Station Chhatarpur railway station in both directions:

- Gita Jayanti Express
- Dr. Ambedkar Nagar - Prayagraj Express
- Bhopal - Khajuraho Mahamana Superfast Express
- Hazrat Nizamuddin–Khajuraho Vande Bharat Express
- Khajuraho - Virangana Lakshmibai Passenger
