= Bhopal–Pratapgarh Express =

Train in India

The Bhopal – Pratapgarh Express is a weekly superfast train which runs between Bhopal Junction railway station of Bhopal, the capital city of Madhya Pradesh and Lucknow, the capital city of Uttar Pradesh and then to a neighbouring town called Pratapgarh.

== Arrival and departure ==
- Train no.12183 departs from Bhopal Junction every Sundays, Mondays, Tuesdays, Thursdays and Fridays at 19:15 hrs., reaching Pratapgarh at 07:30 hrs. the next day.
- Train no.12184 departs from Pratapgarh every Mondays, Tuesdays, Wednesdays, Thursdays and Saturdays at 23:00 hrs., reaching Bhopal Junction the next day at 08:55 hrs.

== Route and halts ==
The train goes via Bina – Jhansi – Kanpur rail route. The important halts of the train are:

- BHOPAL JUNCTION
- Vidisha
- Bina Junction
- Lalitpur
- Jhansi Junction
- Orai
- Kanpur Central
- LUCKNOW
- Rae Bareli Junction
- Amethi
- Pratapgarh

== Coach composite ==
The train normally consist a total of 21 Coaches which are :

- 1 AC II TIER
- 2 AC III TIER
- 13 SLEEPER COACHES
- 4 GENERAL COACH
- 1 PARSEL VAN

The train do not have any pantry car.

== Average speed and frequency ==
The train goes with an average speed of 68 km/hour weekly from both the sites.

== Other trains from Bhopal to Lucknow ==
- 12183/12184 – Bhopal – Lucknow Express (weekly)
