= Bhopal–Khajuraho Mahamana Superfast Express =

Superfast train

Bhopal - Khajuraho Mahamana Superfast Express

Overview
- Service type: Superfast , Mahamana Express
- Locale: 13 July 2017; 8 years ago
- Current operator: West Central Railway zone

Route
- Termini: Bhopal Junction (BPL); Khajuraho (KURJ)
- Stops: 7
- Distance travelled: 367 km (228 mi)
- Average journey time: 6h 40m
- Service frequency: Daily (Note: Runs seven day in a week for every direction.)
- Train number: 22163 / 22164

On-board services
- Classes: AC CHAIR CAR, Second Seating, General Unreserved
- Seating arrangements: Yes
- Sleeping arrangements: No
- Catering facilities: On-board Catering; E-Catering
- Baggage facilities: No
- Other facilities: Below the seats

Technical
- Rolling stock: LHB coach
- Track gauge: 1,676 mm (5 ft 6 in)
- Operating speed: 55 km/h (34 mph), including halts

The Bhopal - Khajuraho Mahamana Superfast Express is a superfast train belonging to West Central Railway zone that runs between Bhopal Junction and Khajuraho in India. It is the only connection between Bhopal and Khajuraho. It is currently being operated with 22163/22164 train numbers on a daily basis.

== Service ==
The 22163/Bhopal - Khajuraho Mahamana SF Express has an average speed of 55 km/h and covers 367 km in 6 hrs 40 mins. 22164/Khajuraho - Bhopal Mahamana SF Express has an average speed of 55 km/h and covers 367 km in 6 hrs 40 mins.

== Route and halts ==
The important halts of the train are:

- Bhopal Junction
- Vidisha
- Ganj Basoda
- Mandi Bamora
- Bina Junction
- Lalitpur Junction
- Tikamgarh
- Khargapur
- Chhatarpur
- Khajuraho

== Coach composite ==
The train has standard LHB rakes with max speed of 130 kmph. The train consists of 10 coaches :

- 1 AC III Chair Car
- 9 Chair Car
- 2 General
- 2 Seating cum Luggage Rake

== Traction ==
since route are fully electrified. Both trains are hauled by an Itarsi based WDP-4D or WDM-3A Diesel locomotive. And they can also carry by a WAP-5 and a WAP-7

== See also ==
- Bhopal Junction railway station
- Khajuraho railway station
- Mahamana Express
- Bhopal–Bina Passenger
- Bhopal – Pratapgarh Express (via Lucknow)
