= Punjab Mail =

Train in India

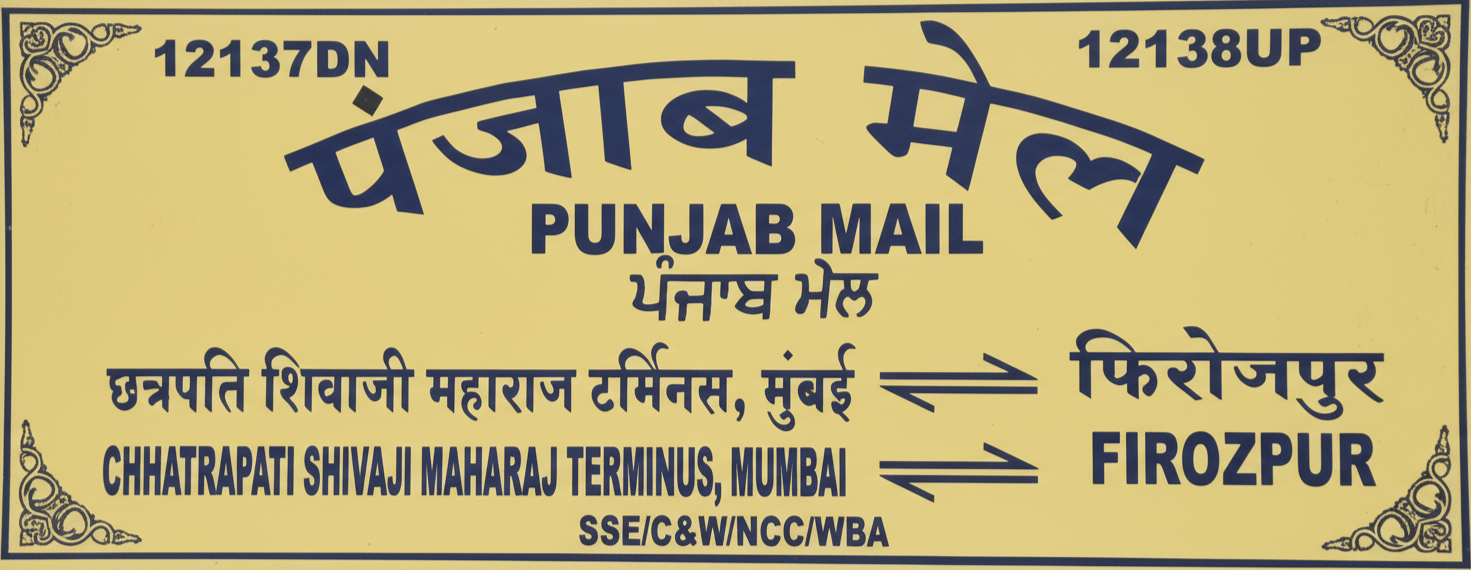

Overview
- Service type: Mail/Express
- Locale: Maharashtra, Madhya Pradesh, Rajasthan, Uttar Pradesh, Haryana, Delhi & Punjab
- First service: 1 November 1889; 137 years ago
- Current operator: Central Railways

Route
- Termini: Mumbai CSMT (CSMT); Firozpur Cantt. (FZR)
- Stops: 56
- Distance travelled: 1,930 km (1,199 mi)
- Average journey time: 34 hrs Approx.
- Service frequency: Daily
- Train number: 12137 / 12138

On-board services
- Classes: General Unreserved, Sleeper Class, AC 2 Tier, AC 3 Tier, AC First cum AC 2 Tier
- Seating arrangements: Yes
- Sleeping arrangements: Yes
- Catering facilities: Available
- Observation facilities: Large windows
- Baggage facilities: Available
- Other facilities: Below the seats

Technical
- Rolling stock: LHB coach
- Track gauge: 1,676 mm (5 ft 6 in)
- Operating speed: 130 km/h (81 mph) maximum, 57 km/h (35 mph) average including halts.

The 12137 / 12138 Punjab Mail is a mail express train of Indian Railways – Central Railway zone that runs between Mumbai CSMT (Maharashtra) and Firozpur Cantt. (Punjab) in India. It operates as train number 12137 from Mumbai CSMT to Ferozpur and as train number 12138 in the reverse direction.

== History ==
With the opening of the Indian Midland Railway's broad-gauge line between Itarsi and Tundla on 1 March 1889, the first through communication on the broad gauge between Bombay and Delhi was established. At the outset, 2 through carriages from Bombay were attached to the East Indian Railway's 1 Up Howrah–Kalka Mail at Tundla. From thereon, the train ran through to Kalka and Lahore with the name 5 Up Bombay mail. This pattern of operations continued until the early 1900s.

After the opening of the Agra–Delhi Chord railway in 1905, the Great Indian Peninsula Railway and the North Western State Railway started a new through service between Bombay and Lahore, going through Gwalior, Agra, Mathura, Delhi, Bathinda, Ferozepur, Kasur and Raiwind. The new service, christened The Punjab Mail, commenced operations from 15 March 1905, covering the distance of 2,560 kilometres (1,590 mi) in 50 hours.

From 1911, the Bombay, Baroda and Central Indian railway (BB&CIR) started operating a through train between Bombay and Peshawar, running through Surat, Baroda, Ratlam, Kota, Mathura, Delhi, Saharanpur, Ambala and Amritsar, known as the Northern Express, covering 2,487 kilometres (1,545 mi) in 48 hours. In response, the Great Indian Peninsular Railway extended the Punjab Mail to run through to Peshawar. However, owing to the lack of line capacity, both the Punjab Mail and the Northern Express ran together clubbed as a single train between Lahore and Peshawar via Narowal, Sialkot, Rawalpindi route until Lahore-Gujranwala-Rawalpindi line came up in 1920s era.

Between 1928 and 1930, a flurry of changes took place in the train services between Bombay and Delhi. As a result of these changes, the Punjab Mail's run was terminated at Lahore from 1 March 1930. However, a bogie composite I and II class through carriage to Peshawar was still run on the Punjab Mail, being attached to the North Western Railway's Northern Express train between Lahore and Peshawar.

From 1 April 1934, the Northern Express, which hitherto had been running through Ambala and Amritsar between Delhi and Lahore, was diverted to run through the BB&CIR's route through Bathinda and Ferozepur and was renamed Punjab Mail. Vice versa was done with the Punjab Mail, which hitherto had been running through Ferozepur between Delhi and Lahore, was diverted to run via Saharanpur, Ambala, Amritsar and was renamed Frontier Mail.

During the unrest following the partition of India, the Punjab Mail, along with a host of other trains running to Lahore and beyond, was terminated at Delhi for the period between 1947 and 1948. Shortly after the partition and nationalization of Railways, the service was extended to Hussainiwala near Ferozepur on the India–Pakistan border. The train still runs on this route to this day but uptill Ferozepur only.

== Myths and misconceptions ==
Due to the paucity of research material, until recent years, most of the known history of this train was gathered through hearsay and anecdotal evidence. As a result, many sources cite that the Punjab Mail commenced services from 1 June 1912, as the Punjab Limited, operating between Ballard Pier and Peshawar. However, this is factually incorrect.

The Punjab Limited was a postal special train that was started by the GIPR from 27 October 1927, to provide a fast postal service between Bombay, Delhi, Lahore and Peshawar. This was a special train that ran in conjunction with the English mail steamer at Bombay and operated alongside the regular Punjab Mail. This special train competed with the BB&CIR's P&O Express. Due to the success of the BB&CIR's P&O Express, which later became the Frontier Mail, the Punjab Limited was discontinued after a short period. The Punjab Mail was unrelated to the Punjab Limited.

The Punjab Mail never operated from the Ballard Pier Mole station. On the GIP Railway, only the Imperial Indian Mail and the Punjab Limited operated from the Ballard Pier station.

== Coaches ==
The 12137/12138 Punjab Mail presently has 4 General Unreserved Coaches,6 Sleeper Coaches,6 AC-3-Tier Coaches, 2 AC-2-Tier Coaches,1 AC 1st-Cum-AC-2-Tier Coaches,2 Generator Car and 1 Pantry car. Earlier was ICF rakes

As with most train services in India, coach composition may be amended at the discretion of Indian Railways depending on demand.

It also carries a Railway Mail coach thus earning it the title of "Mail" in its name.

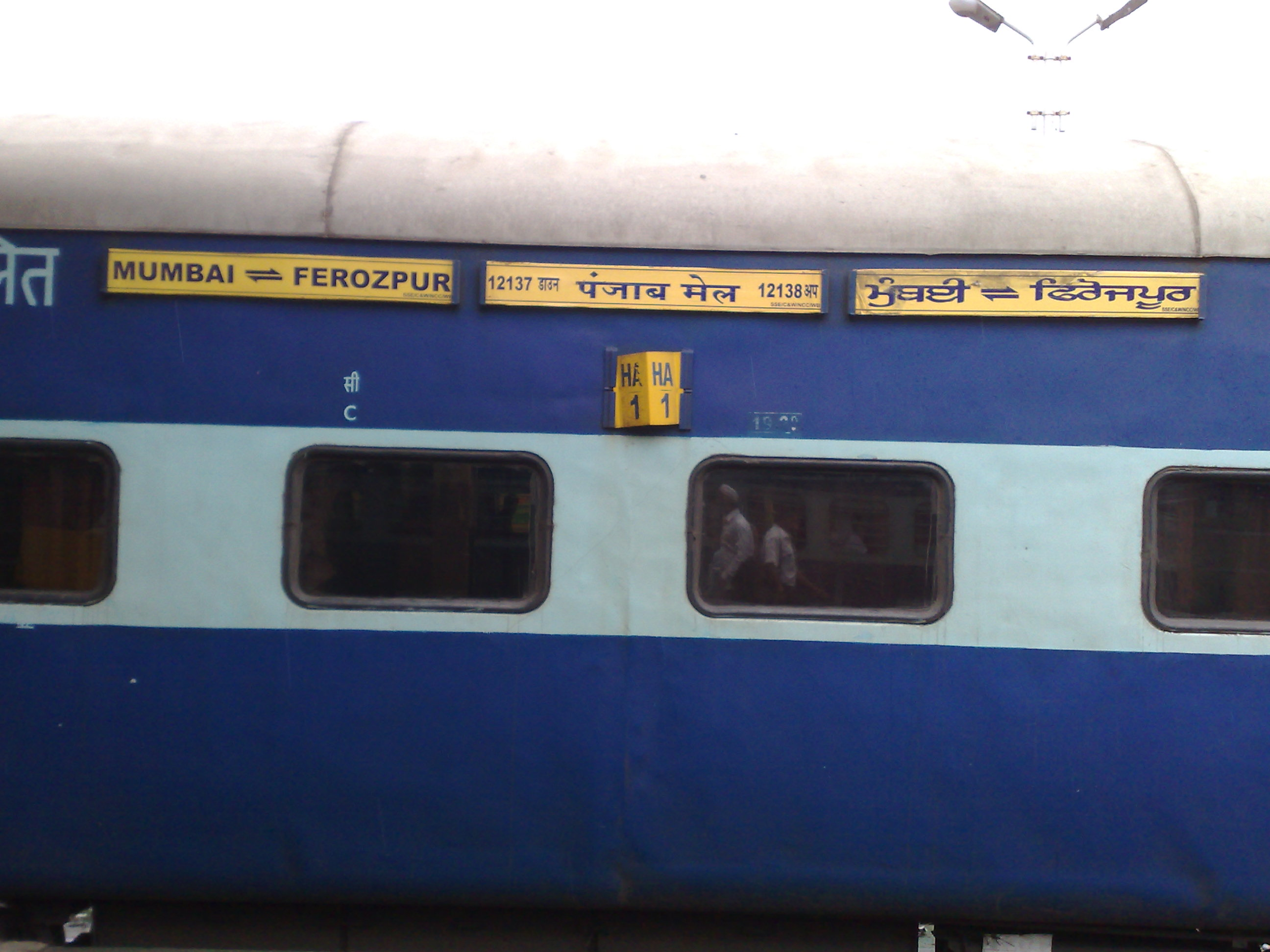
12138 Punjab Mail – AC 1st cum AC 2 tier coach

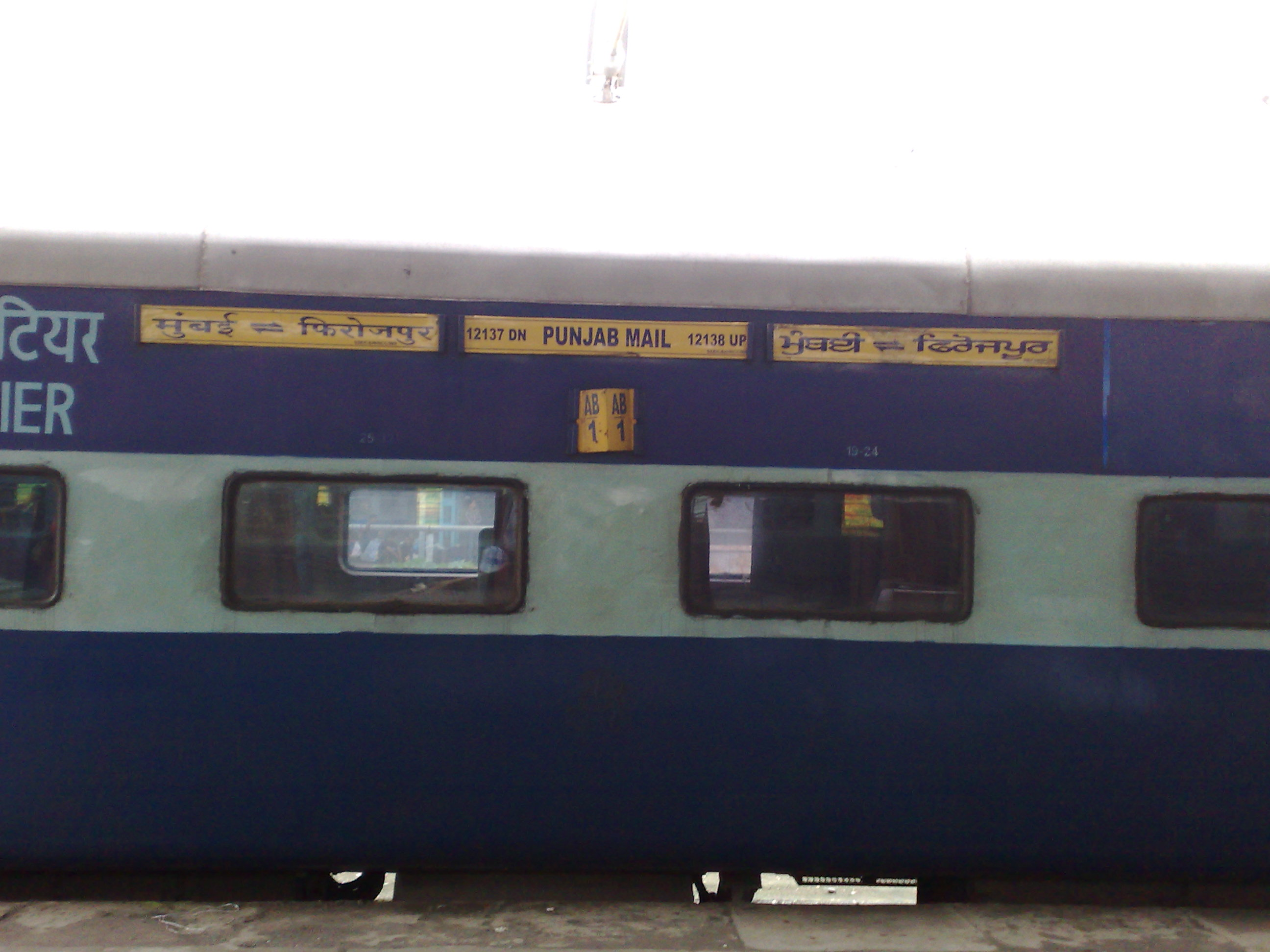
12138 Punjab Mail – AC 3 tier cum AC 2 tier coach

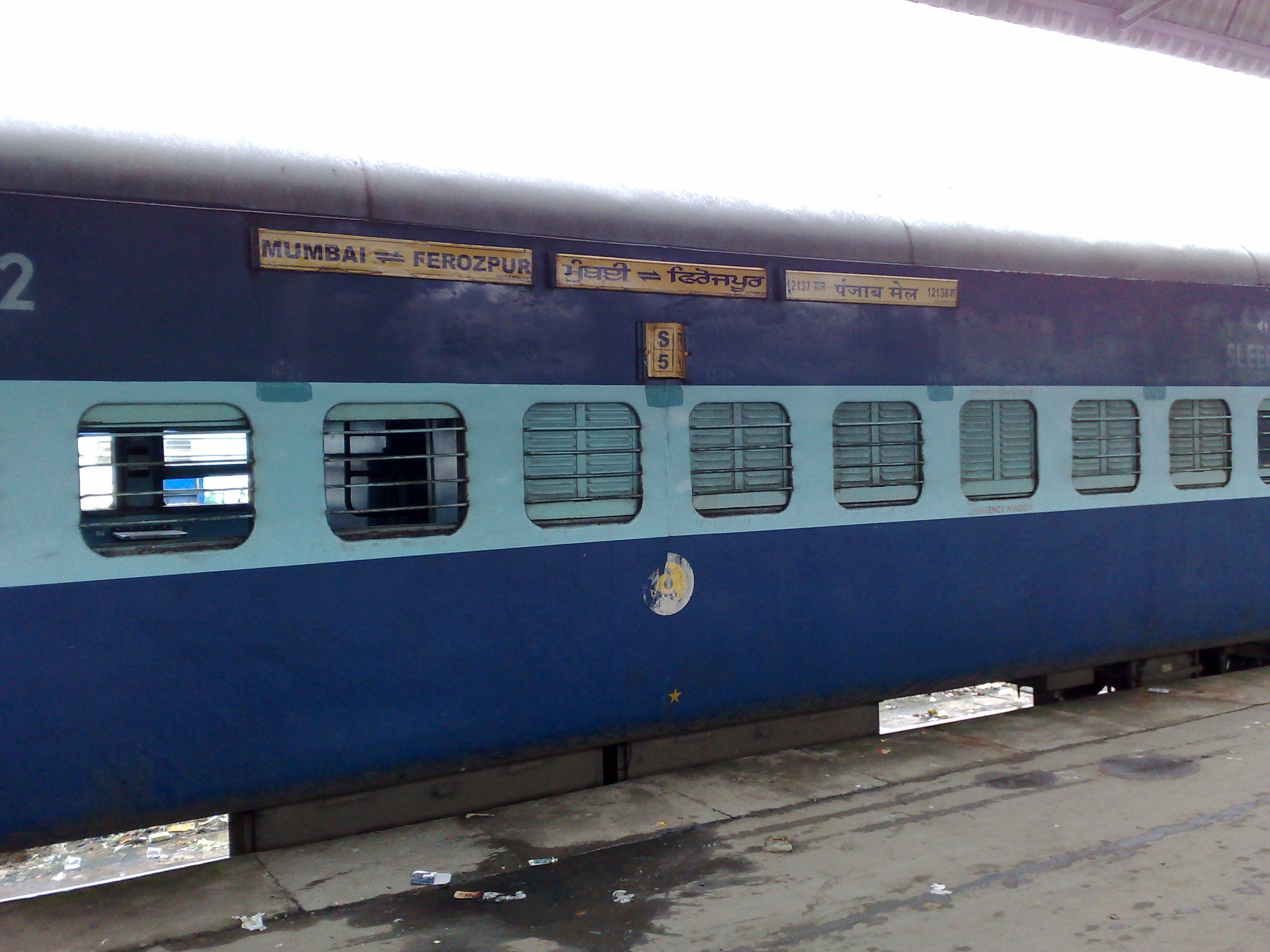
12138 Punjab Mail – Sleeper Class coach

== Service ==
The 12137 Punjab Mail covers the distance of 1930 kilometres in 34 hours 00 mins (56.76 km/h) and in 33 hours 55 mins as 12138 Punjab Mail (56.90 km/h).

As the average speed of the train is above 55 km/h (34 mph), as per Indian Railways rules, its fare includes a Superfast surcharge.

== Route and halts ==
The 12137/12138 Punjab Mail runs from Mumbai CSMT via Dadar, Kalyan Junction, Igatpuri, Nasik Road, Jalgaon, Bhusawal Burhanpur, Khandwa, Harda, Itarsi Junction, Bhopal Junction,Vidisha,Ganj Basoda, Bina Junction, Lalitpur Junction,Jhansi Junction, Gwalior Junction, Agra Cantonment, Mathura, Hazrat Nizamuddin, New Delhi, Rohtak Junction, Jind Junction, Narwana, Jakhal, Bathinda, Kot Kapura, Faridkot to Firozpur Cantonment.

== Traction ==
It is hauled by an Ajni Loco Shed-based WAP-7 electric locomotive from Mumbai CSMT to Firozpur Cantonment and vice versa.
