= Bundelkhand Express =

Train in India

Overview
- Service type: Express
- Locale: Madhya Pradesh & Uttar Pradesh
- Current operator(s): North Central Railway

Route
- Termini: Gwalior (GWL); Banaras (BSBS)
- Stops: 28
- Distance travelled: 624 km (388 mi)
- Average journey time: 14 hours 10 minutes
- Service frequency: Daily
- Train number(s): 11107 / 11108

On-board services
- Class(es): AC First Class, AC 2 tier, AC 3 tier, Sleeper Class, General Unreserved
- Seating arrangements: Yes
- Sleeping arrangements: Yes
- Catering facilities: On-board catering, E-catering
- Baggage facilities: No
- Other facilities: Below the seats

Technical
- Rolling stock: LHB coach
- Track gauge: 1,676 mm (5 ft 6 in)
- Operating speed: 43 km/h (27 mph) average including halts.

The 11107 / 11108 Bundelkhand Express is an Express train belonging to Indian Railways – North Central Railway zone that runs between Gwalior Junction and Banaras. It is also an ISO certified train.

It operates with train number 11107 from Gwalior Junction to Banaras and with train number 11108 in the reverse direction, serving the states of Uttar Pradesh and Madhya Pradesh.

It is named after the Bundelkhand region of the states of Madhya Pradesh and Uttar Pradesh.

== Coaches ==
The 11107/11108 Bundelkhand Express has 1 AC First Class cum AC 3 tier, 1 AC 2 tier, 8 Sleeper class, 6 General Unreserved & 2 SLR (Seating cum Luggage Rake) Coaches. It does not carry a pantry car.

As is customary with most train services in India, coach composition may be amended at the discretion of Indian Railways depending on demand.

== Service ==
The 11107 Bundelkhand Express covers the distance of 624 km (388 mi) in 14 hours 10 mins (44.05 km/h) and in 15 hours 10 mins as 11108 Bundelkhand Express (41.14 km/h).

As the average speed of the train is below 55 km/h (34 mph), as per Indian Railways rules, its fare does not include a Superfast surcharge.

== Routeing ==
The 11107/11108 Bundelkhand Express runs from Gwalior Junction via Virangana Lakshmibai Jhansi Junction, Banda Junction, Manikpur Junction, Prayagraj Junction, Janghai Junction to Banaras.

It reverses direction of travel once at Prayagraj Junction.

== Traction ==
Previously, a Jhansi / Mughalsarai-based WDM-3A locomotive powered the train for its entire journey as large sections of the route were not electrified.

As the route is fully electrified, it is now hauled by a Kanpur Loco Shed-based WAP-7 or Jhansi Loco Shed-based WAP-4 electric locomotive between Banaras and Gwalior Junction.
