= Lalitpur, India =

Lalitpur
- City
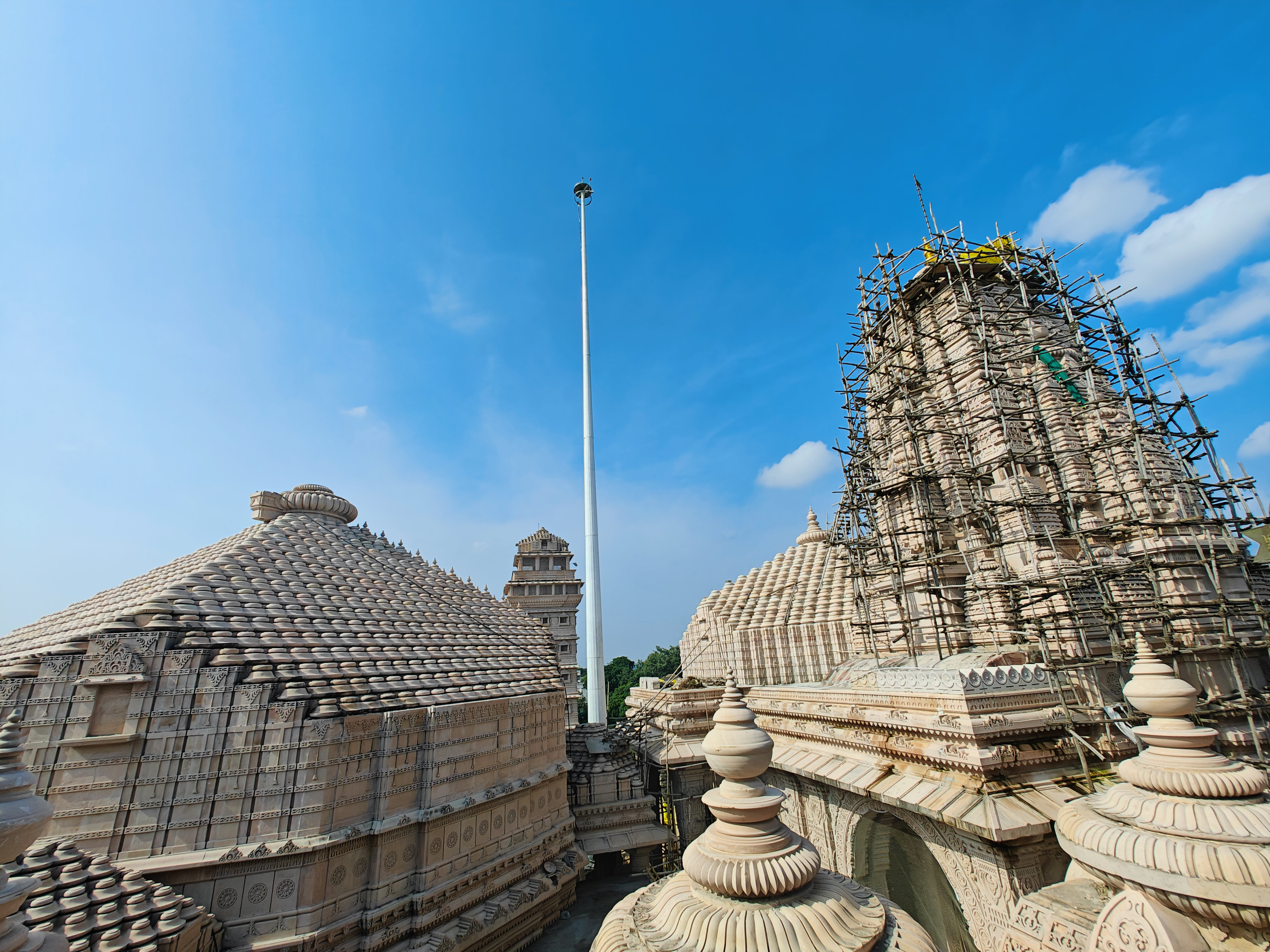
- Abhinandanoday Jain Teerth Kshetra

- Location within Uttar Pradesh Location within India
- Coordinates: 24.69°N 78.41°E
- Country: India
- State: Uttar Pradesh
- District: Lalitpur
- Elevation: 428 m (1,404 ft)

Population (2011)
  - Total: 133,305
  - Density: 242/km^{2} (630/sq mi)

Languages
  - Official: Hindi
- Time zone: UTC+5:30 (IST)
- Vehicle registration: UP-94
- Sex ratio: 0.917 ♂/♀
- Website: www.lalitpur.nic.in

Lalitpur is a city and a municipal board in Lalitpur District, India in the Indian state of Uttar Pradesh. It is also the district headquarters of Lalitpur district. The city is part of the Bundelkhand region.

Raja Sumer Singh Bundela, a chieftain from Central India, is said to have founded Lalitpur, and named it after his queen Lalita Devi, who cured him of a snake that lodged in his stomach, of which story parallels are heard in several places (see Cunningham’s Archaeological Report, Vol. X).

== History ==
Lalitpur was ruled by Bundela Rajputs. Raja Mardan Singh Bundela, the Bundela king of Lalitpur at the time was one of the prominent figures to take up arms against the British in the First War of Independence in 1857.

== Demographics ==
As per provisional data of 2011 census, Lalitpur had a population of 133,305, out of which males were 69,529 and females were 54,062. The literacy rate is 82.39% with male literacy being 89.12% and female literacy being 75.06%.

Religion in Lalitpur City
Religion	Percent
Hindus	76.27%
Muslims	13.72%
Jains	8.99%
Others	1.02%

Out of the total population, Hinduism is practised by 76.27% people, Islam 13.72%, Jainism 8.99% and the rest 1.02% follow other faiths.

== Tourism ==
Deogarh is a village in Lalitpur district of the Indian state of Uttar Pradesh. It is located on the right bank of Betwa River and to the west of Lalitpur hills. It is known for Gupta monuments and for many ancient monuments of Hindu and Jain origins inside and outside the walls of the fort.The Dashavatara Temple is an early 6th century Vishnu Hindu temple located at Deogarh, Uttar Pradesh which is 25 kilometers from Lalitpur, in the Betwa River valley in northern-central India. It has a simple, one cell square plan and is one of the earliest Hindu stone temples still surviving today. Built in the Gupta Period, the Dashavatara Temple at Deogarh shows the ornate Gupta style architecture. Neelkantheshwar Temple is an ancient temple of Lord Shiva is situated at Lalitpur which is famous for its beautiful architecture.

Talbehat Fort, The history of Talbehat Fort is tied to Maharaja Mardan Singh Bundela, a ruler who fought against the British alongside Rani Laxmi Bai during the 1857 Indian Rebellion from this fort. The fort itself serves as a historical site located on the Jhansi-Lalitpur road and also contains three ancient temples dedicated to Angad, Hanuman, and Narsimha.

== Transport ==
=== Railway ===
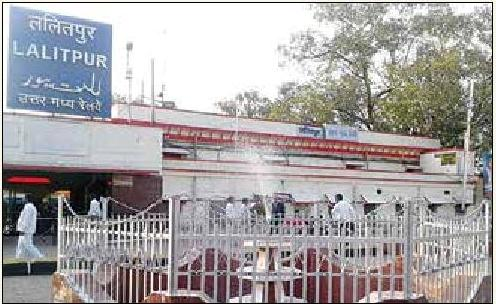
Railway Station Lalitpur

Lalitpur Junction has very good rail connections with major Indian cities including New Delhi, Mumbai, Chennai, Patna, Indore, Bhopal, Gwalior, Jabalpur, Ujjain, Saugor, Puri, Prayagraj, Bengaluru, Damoh, and Jhansi. A new railway line connecting Lalitpur to Tikamgarh started in 2013. Now this line has been extended to Khajuraho. The nearest junctions are Jhansi Junction and Bina Junction in Madhya Pradesh.

The important trains such as the Shatabdi express, Malwa Express, Punjab Mail, Bhopal - Lucknow Express, Jabalpur - Jammu Tawi Express, Gondwana Express, Bhopal Express, sachkhand express, mahamana express, pathankot express, Pushpak Express, Kushinagar Express and many others stop at Lalitpur.

=== Road ===
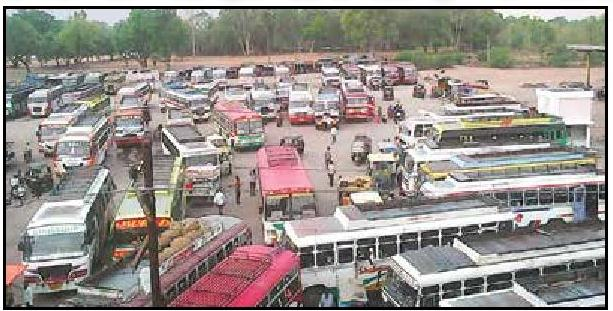
Bus Stand Lalitpur

The proposed North-south-Corridor of the Golden-Quadrilateral Highway project passes through lalitpur is completed.. It is located 97 km (61 mi) from Jhansi. Lalitpur [2025] edited ▲284403.

=== Air ===
Lalitpur is the only place in Bundelkhand Region having an Airstrip maintained by the Airport Authority of India.
