= Lalitpur Junction railway station =

Railway station of Lalitpur, Uttar Pradesh, India

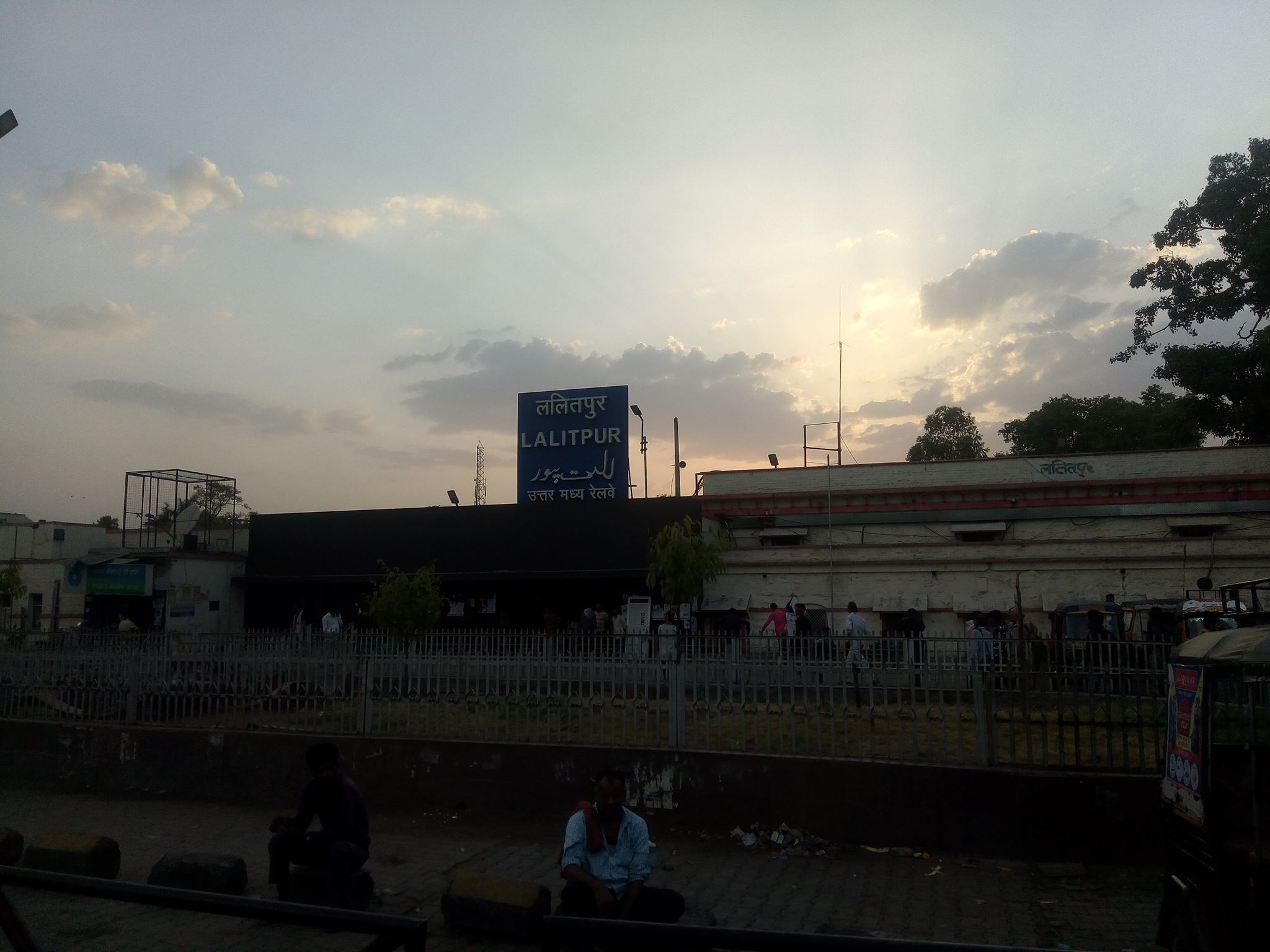
- Lalitpur Junction Railway Station

General information
- Location: Lalitpur district, India; India
- Coordinates: 24.6882°N 78.3959°E
- Elevation: 373 metres (1,224 ft)
- System: Indian Railways station
- Owner: Indian Railways
- Operator: North Central Railway
- Lines: New Delhi–Mumbai main line Lalitpur–Khajuraho–Singrauli line
- Platforms: 3
- Tracks: 6
- Connections: Auto stand

Construction
- Structure type: At grade
- Parking: yes
- Cycle facilities: yes

Other information
- Status: Active
- Station code: LAR
- Zone(s): North Central Railway
- Division(s): Jhansi
Location
- Location within India Location within Uttar Pradesh

Lalitpur Junction railway station is an important railway station in Lalitpur district, Uttar Pradesh, India. Its code is LAR. It serves Lalitpur city and towns such as Chanderi in nearby Madhya Pradesh. The station consists of three platforms. The platforms are not well sheltered. The station was connected with Tikamgarh in 2013and further to Khajuraho by 2016.

== Trains ==
- Ujjaini Express
- Malwa Express
- Punjab Mail
- Bhopal–Lucknow Express
- Jabalpur–Jammu Tawi Express
- Gondwana Express
- Patalkot Express
- Shatabdi Express
- Sachkhand Express
- Delhi–Pathankot Superfast Express
- Pushpak Express
- Kushinagar Express
- Hazrat Nizamuddin–Jabalpur Express
- Jabalpur–H.Nizamuddin Express
- Gorakhpur–Secunderabad Express
- Gorakhpur–Yesvantpur Express
- Raptisagar Express
- Raptisagar Express
- Tulsi Express
- Kalinga Utkal Express
- Lokmanya Tilak Terminus–Lucknow Junction Superfast Express
- Bhopal–Pratapgarh Express
- Indore–Patna Express
- Hirakud Express
- Dakshin Express
- Sabarmati Express
- Samata Express
- Chhattisgarh Express
- Panchvalley Passenger
- Habibganj–New Delhi Shatabdi Express
- Jhelum Express
- Dr. Ambedkar Nagar–Prayagraj Express
- Bhopal–Khajuraho Mahamana Superfast Express
