= Khajuraho railway station =

Railway station in Madhya Pradesh, India

Khajuraho
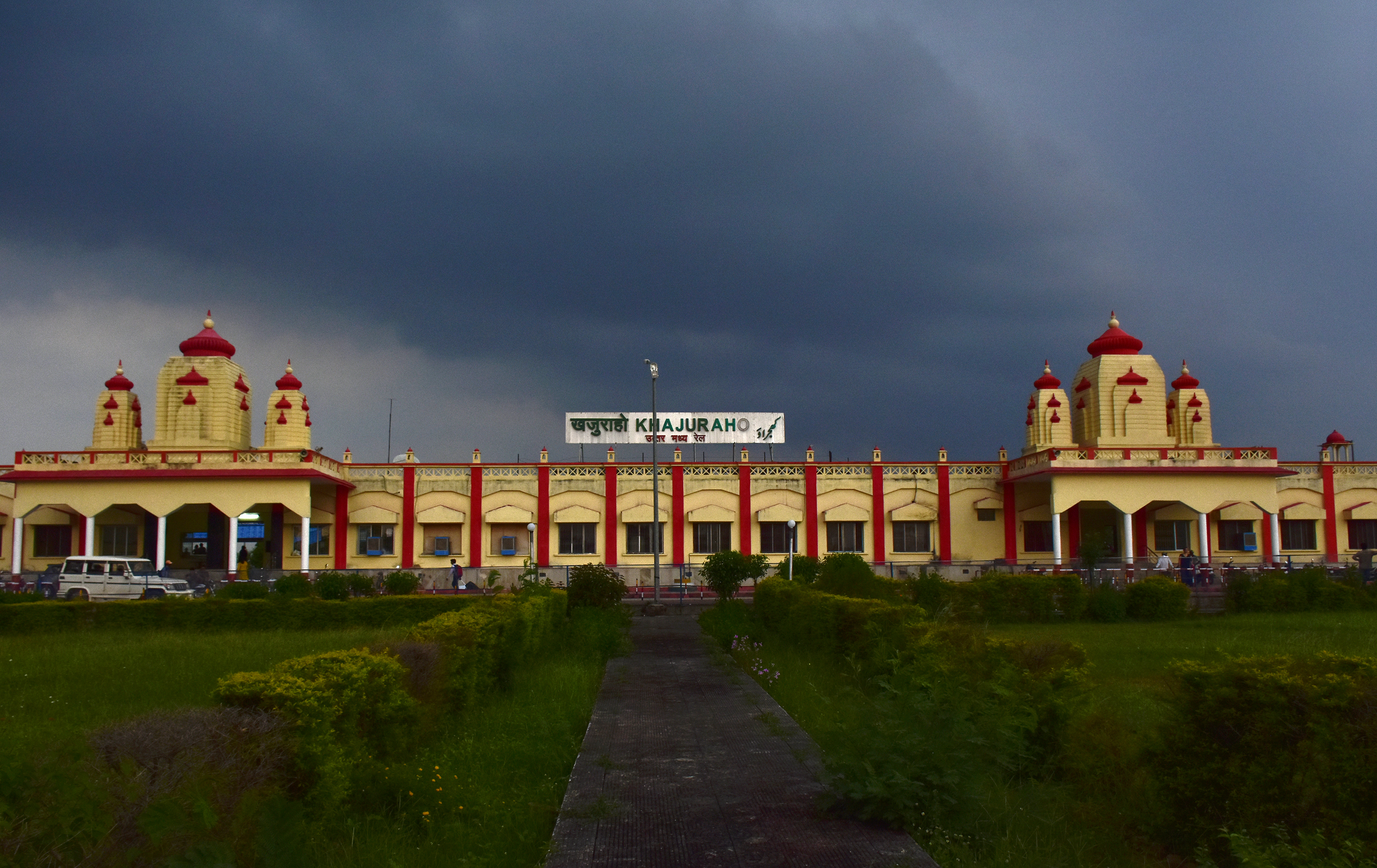
- Entrance of the Khajuraho railway station

General information
- Location: Bamitha Khajuraho Road (near NH 75), Khajuraho, District. Chhatarapur, Madhya Pradesh; India
- Coordinates: 24°47′48″N 79°53′21″E
- Elevation: 227 metres (745 ft)
- System: Indian Railways station
- Owner: Indian Railways
- Operator: North Central Railways
- Line: Allahabad–Jabalpur section
- Platforms: 3

Construction
- Structure type: Standard on ground
- Parking: Yes
- Cycle facilities: No

Other information
- Status: Functioning
- Station code: KURJ
- Division(s): Jhansi

History
- Opened: 2008; 18 years ago
Location
- Location within Madhya Pradesh

Khajuraho railway station is located in Chhatarpur district of Madhya Pradesh and serves as an entry point for the Khajuraho Group of Monuments, medieval Hindu monuments famous for their erotic sculptures. Between 950 CE and 1150 CE, the Chandelas monarchs built these temples.

== History ==
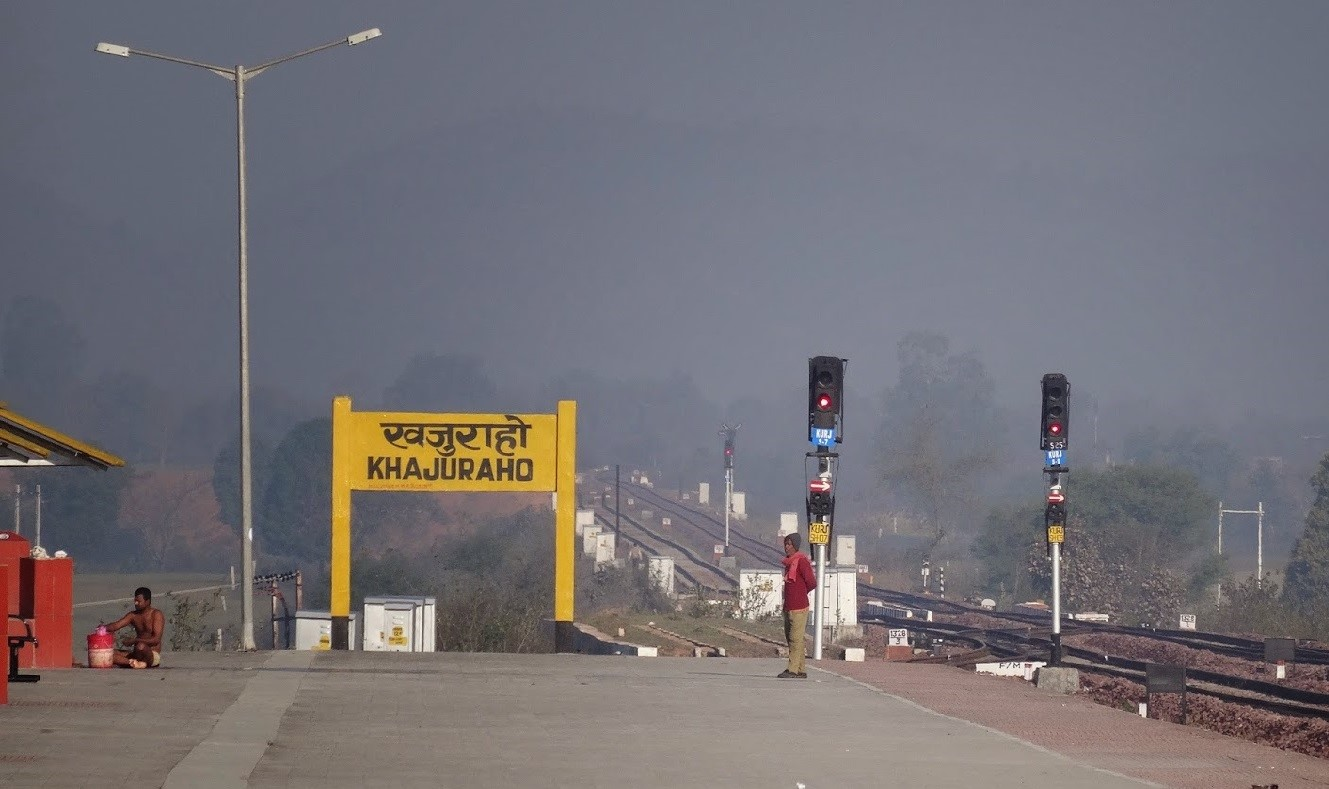
Khajuraho station

The Jhansi–Manikpur line was opened in 1889 by Indian Midland Railway. A branch line linking Khajuraho to Mahoba on the Jhansi–Manikpur line was inaugurated in 2008. Khajuraho is linked by train to Jhansi on the Delhi–Chennai line and Kanpur on the Howrah–Delhi line.

== Amenities ==
There is a cloak room at Khajuraho railway station where one can leave one's luggage for a nominal payment. Small shops sell Khajuraho local maps.

== Passenger movement ==
Khajuraho railway station handles around 3,000 passengers every day.

As of 2016 January, it is connected by a daily train to Delhi via Mahoba, Jhansi and Gwalior. It is also connected by a daily train that connects it to Agra, Jaipur and Udaipur. A local daily train also connects to Kanpur and Varanasi is connected thrice a week.

== Trains ==
- Khajuraho–Kurukhetra via Hazrat Nizamuddin 11841/11842
- Vande Bharat Express H.Nizamuddin <> Khajuraho 22470/22469
- Khajuraho–Udaipur City Express
- Bundelkhand Express
- Bhopal–Khajuraho Mahamana Superfast Express
- Dr. Ambedkar Nagar–Prayagraj Express
- Mahoba–Khajauraho Passenger
- Khajuraho–Virangana Lakshmibai Passenger
- Khajuraho–Kanpur Passenger
- Hazrat Nizamuddin–Khajuraho Vande Bharat Express
- 19483/ADI-BJU Express

Preceding station	Indian Railways	Following station
Terminus	North Central Railway zone Mahoba–Khajuraho branch line	Rajnagar towards ?
