= Khargapur =

- Town
- Location in Madhya Pradesh, India Khargapur (India)
- Coordinates: 24.82°N 79.15°E
- Country: India
- State: Madhya Pradesh
- District: Tikamgarh
- Elevation: 305 m (1,001 ft)

Population (2011)
  - Total: 14,813

Languages
  - Official: Hindi
- Time zone: UTC+5:30 (IST)
- Vehicle registration: MP-36

Khargapur is a town and a nagar panchayat in Tikamgarh district in the Indian state of Madhya Pradesh. Khargapur is an assembly constituency.

== History ==
Khargapur was the part of vast empires successively ruled by the Mauryas, the Shungas and the Guptas. It was in the first quarter of ninth century AD., that Mannuka founded a new Chandela dynasty in the area. Khargapur at that time came under this dynasty. Then successively it was ruled by Bundelas of Orchha estate and possessed more than 125 jagirs under its dynasty. The fifth son of Vir Singh Deo (ruler of Orchha, 1605–1627) was sent from Orchha to rule Khargapur.

Khargapur also has an ancient Digambar Jain temple.

This place had been actively involved in the Indian independence movement and contributed in the movement under the leadership of freedom fighter Shri Nathuram Goswami.

== Geography ==
Khargapur is located at 24.82°N 79.15°E. It has an average elevation of 305 metres (1000 feet). It is about 40 km away from district Tikamgarh.

== Demographics ==
As of 2001 India census, Khargapur had a population of 12,412. Males constitute 53% of the population and females 47%. Khargapur has an average literacy rate of 50%, lower than the national average of 59.5%: male literacy is 59%, and female literacy is 40%. In Khargapur, 18% of the population is under 6 years of age.

== Other details ==
The town has recently been made a separate block in Tikamgarh district, with its own police station and Tahsil.

Nearby metros: Kanpur, Bhopal, Lucknow, Agra

Spoken languages: Bundelkhandi, Hindi

Nearby airports (200 miles): Khajuraho (HJR, 41.3919 miles), Gwalior (GWL, 110.411 miles), Bhopal (BHO, 143.256 miles), Lucknow (LKO, 168.751 miles), Agra (AGR, 174.557 miles)
