= Pushpak Express =

Train in India

Pushpak Superfast Express
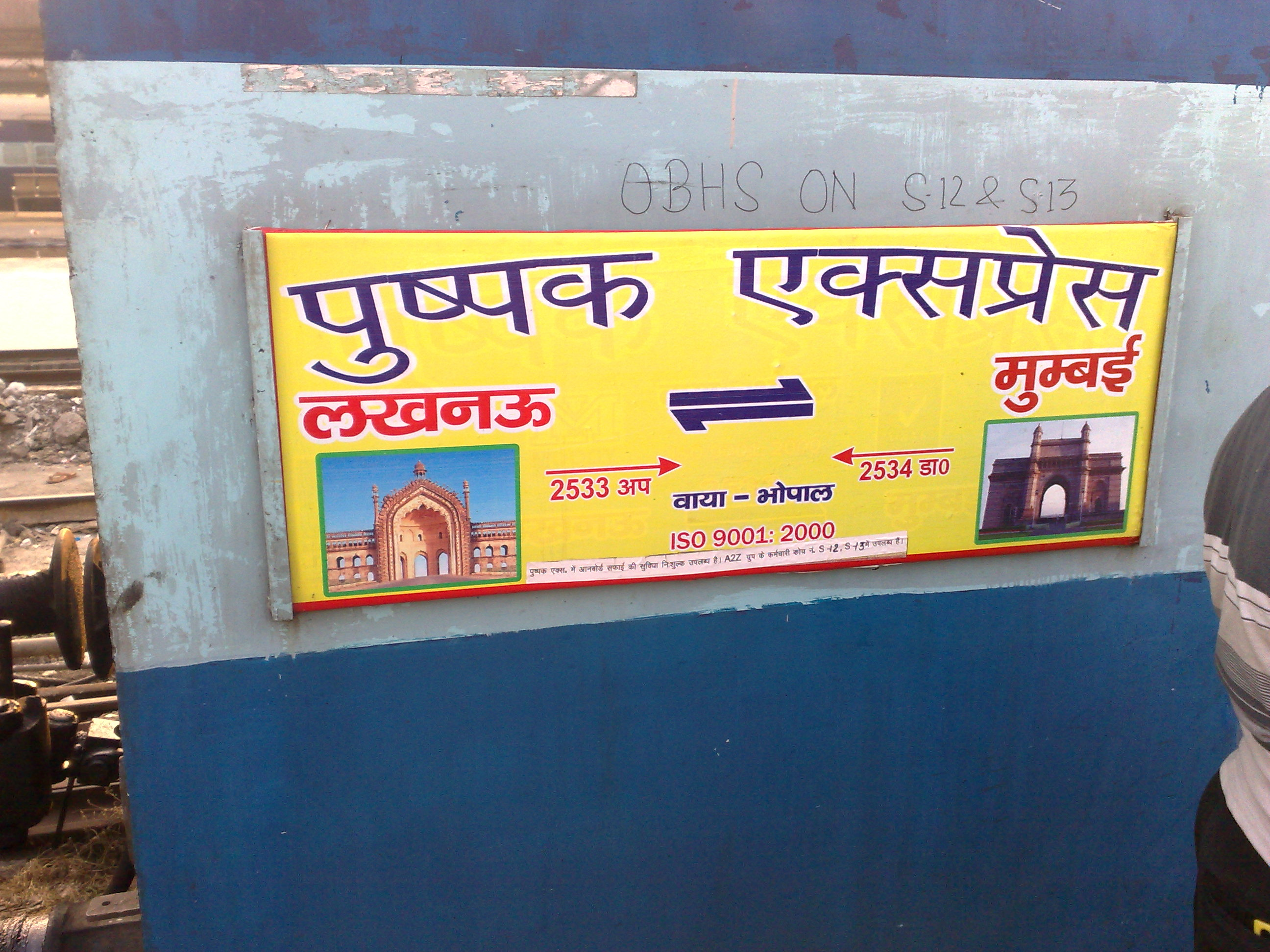

Overview
- Service type: Superfast Express
- Locale: Uttar Pradesh, Madhya Pradesh & Maharashtra
- First service: 1 April 1987; 39 years ago
- Current operator: North Eastern Railway

Route
- Termini: Lucknow Junction (LJN); Mumbai CSMT (CSMT)
- Stops: 16
- Distance travelled: 1,428 km (887 mi)
- Average journey time: 22hrs 45mins
- Service frequency: Daily
- Train number: 12533 / 12534

On-board services
- Classes: AC First Class, AC 2 tier, AC 3 tier, Sleeper Class, General Unreserved
- Seating arrangements: Yes
- Sleeping arrangements: Yes
- Catering facilities: Available
- Observation facilities: Large windows
- Baggage facilities: Available
- Other facilities: Below the seats

Technical
- Rolling stock: LHB coach
- Track gauge: 1,676 mm (5 ft 6 in)
- Electrification: Fully Electrified
- Operating speed: 67 km/h (42 mph) average including halts.

The 12533 / 12534 Pushpak SF Express is a Daily Superfast Express category train belonging to Indian Railways that runs between Gomti Nagar (Lucknow) in Uttar Pradesh and Chhatrapati Shivaji Maharaja Terminus, Mumbai in Maharashtra, India. It operates as train number 12533 from Lucknow to Mumbai and as train number 12534 in the reverse direction. Pushpak SF Express is the fastest train between CSMT in Mumbai and Lucknow in Uttar Pradesh covering distance of 1438 km in 26.00 hours.

It is named after the mythological flying chariot Pushpak which is mentioned as the chariot of Ravana.

== Service ==
The 12533/12534 Pushpak Express covers the distance of 1438 kilometres in 26 hours 00 mins as 12533 Pushpak Express and maintains an average speed of 55 km/h and 1438 km in 23 hours 35 mins as 12534 Pushpak Express with an average speed of 63 km/h.

As the average speed of the train is more than 55 km/h, its fare includes a Superfast surcharge.

== Locomotive ==
Prior to June 2014, it was hauled by three locomotives during its journey. A WDM-3A locomotive from either Lucknow or Jhansi shed hauled the train from Lucknow Junction to Jhansi Junction after which a Bhusawal-based WAP-4 hauled the train until Igatpuri following which a WCAM-3 powered the train for the remainder of the journey until Mumbai CSMT.

With progressive electrification of the Lucknow–Jhansi sector, Bhusawal-based WAP-4 began hauling the train until from Lucknow Junction to Igatpuri, following which a WCAM-3 took over for the remainder of the journey until Mumbai CSMT.

With Central Railway completing the changeover of 1500 V DC traction to 25 kV AC traction on 6 June 2015, the train was to be hauled by WAP-4 but from 2016, this train is now end to end hauled by an Ajni-based WAP-7 locomotive.

== Coaches ==
As with most train services in India, coach composition may be amended at the discretion of Indian Railways depending on demand. From 30 October 2021 the train has been upgraded to a new LHB coach.

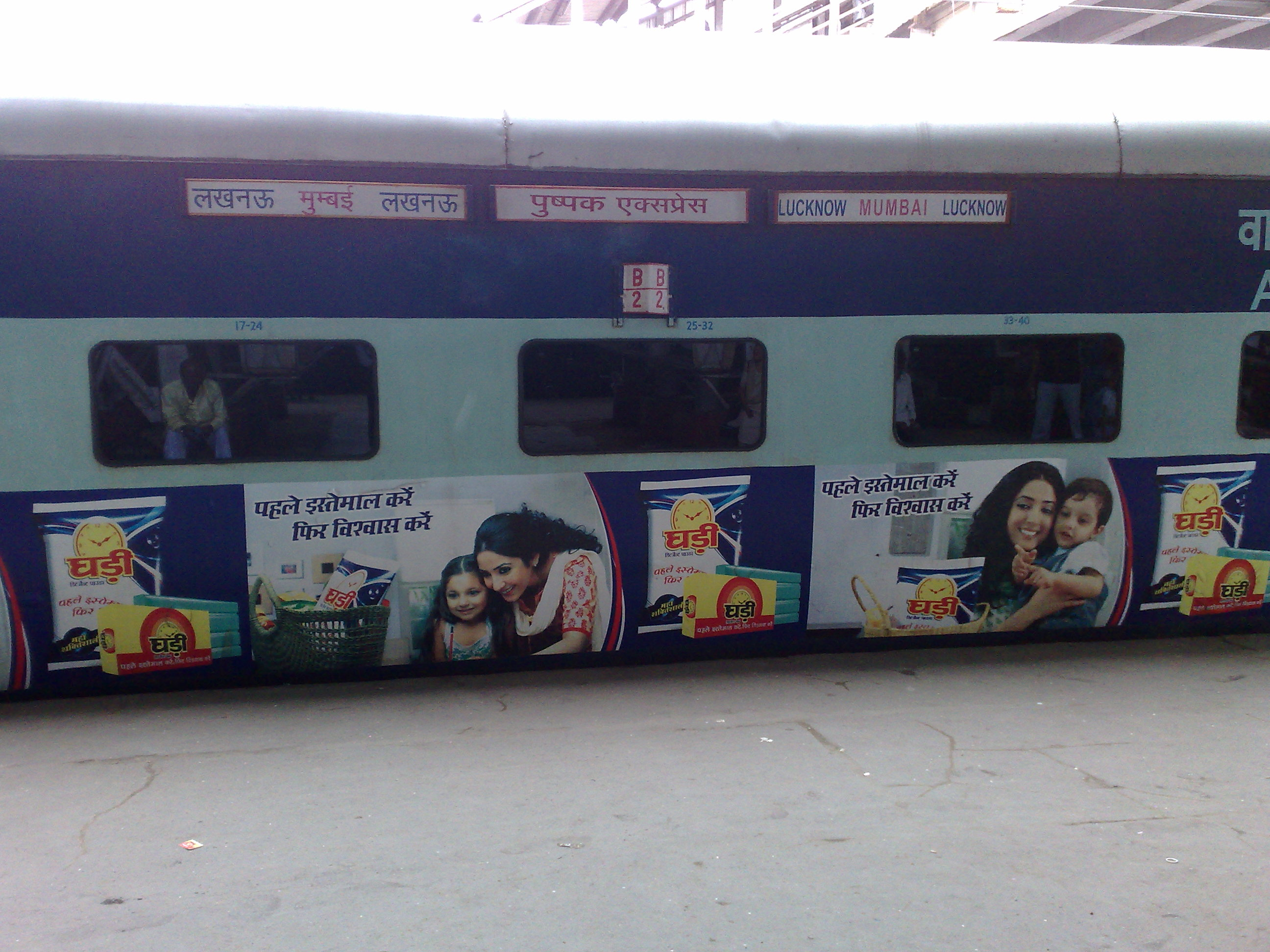
12534 Pushpak Express – AC 3 tier

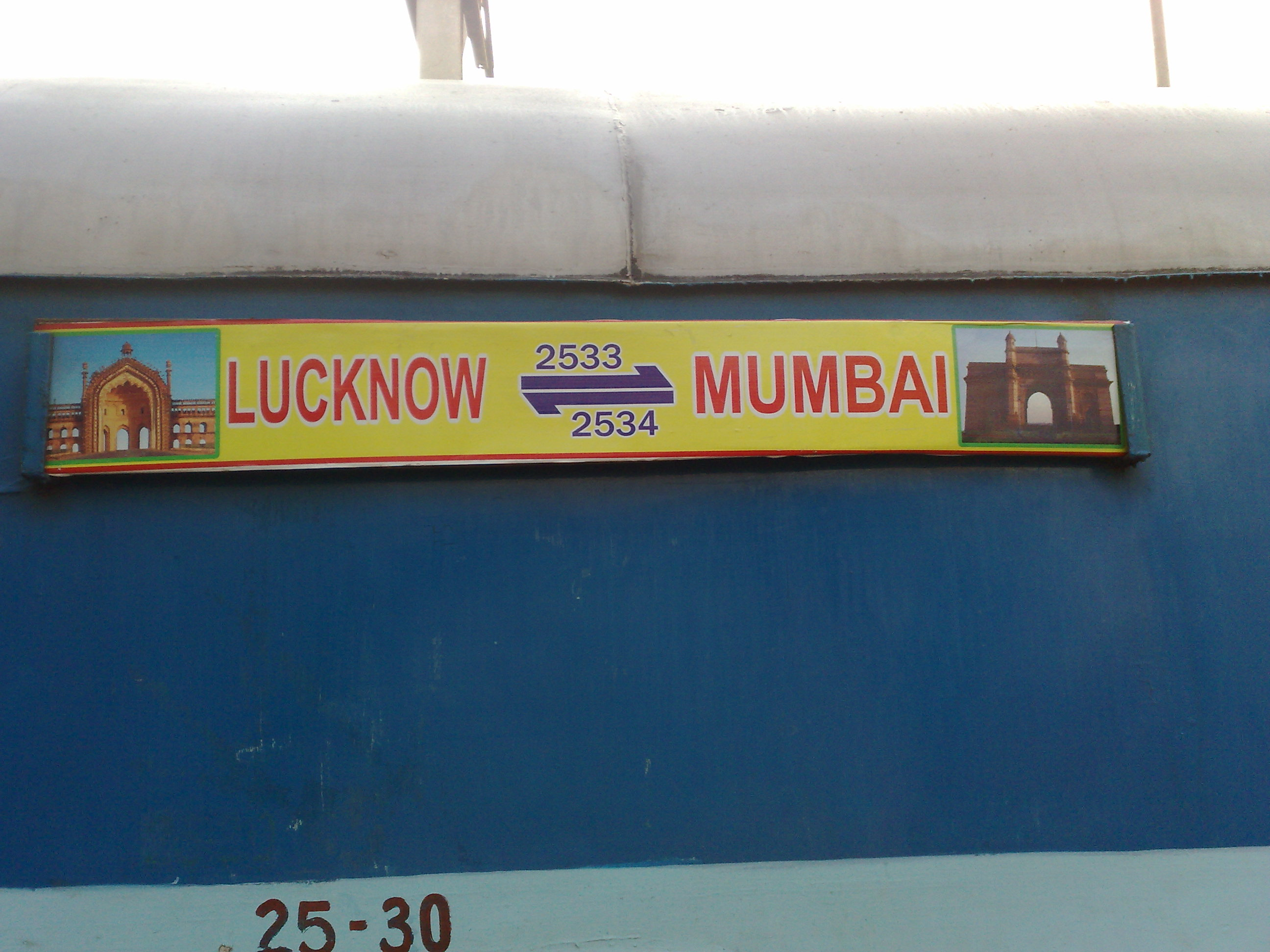
12534 Pushpak Express

| Loco | 1 | 2 | 3 | 4 | 5 | 6 | 7 | 8 | 9 | 10 | 11 | 12 | 13 | 14 | 15 | 16 | 17 | 18 | 19 | 20 | 21 | 22 |
|---|---|---|---|---|---|---|---|---|---|---|---|---|---|---|---|---|---|---|---|---|---|---|
| | SLR | Gen | Gen | S1 | S2 | S3 | S4 | PC | M1 | M2 | M3 | M4 | M5 | B1 | B2 | B3 | A1 | A2 | H1 | EOG | | |

- SLR consists of Luggage coach
- Gen consists of Unreserved coaches
- H consists of First Class AC 1 coach
- A consists of AC 2 Tier coach
- M consists of AC 3 Tier Economy coach
- B consists of AC 3 Tier coach
- S consists of Non-AC Sleeper coach

== Routing ==
The 12533/34 Pushpak Express runs via Kanpur Central, Jhansi Junction, Bhopal Junction, Bhusaval Junction, Nashik Road Kalyan Junction to Mumbai CST.

| PUSHPAK EXPRESS | | | 12533 UP | | | | | 12534 Down | | | | |
| SN | Station name | Code | Arr. time | Dep. time | Halt | Distance | Day | Arr. time | Dep. time | Halt | Distance | Day |
|---|---|---|---|---|---|---|---|---|---|---|---|---|
| 1 | Gomti Nagar | GTNR | Source | 20:45 | - | 0 | 1 | 08:10 | Destination | - | 1438 | 2 |
| 2 | Badshah Nagar | BNZ | 20:50 | 21:00 | 05 | 4 | 1 | 07:30 | 07:35 | 05 | 1433 | 2 |
| 3 | Aishbagh Jn | ASH | 21:23 | 21:25 | 02 | 13 | 1 | 07:13 | 07:15 | 02 | 1425 | 2 |
| 4 | Unnao Jn | ON | 22:20 | 22:22 | 02 | 54 | 1 | 05:31 | 05:33 | 02 | 1371 | 2 |
| 5 | Kanpur Central | CNB | 23:05 | 23:10 | 05 | 71 | 1 | 04:55 | 05:05 | 10 | 1353 | 2 |
| 6 | Orai | ORAI | 00:37 | 00:39 | 02 | 178 | 2 | 02:18 | 02:20 | 02 | 1247 | 2 |
| 7 | Virangana Lakshmibai Jhansi Jn | VGLJ | 02:40 | 02:48 | 03 | 292 | 2 | 00:55 | 01:03 | 08 | 1133 | 2 |
| 8 | Lalitpur Jn | LAR | 04:00 | 04:02 | 02 | 382 | 2 | 23:46 | 23:48 | 02 | 1043 | 1 |
| 9 | Bhopal Jn | BPL | 07:00 | 07:10 | 10 | 584 | 2 | 21:15 | 21:25 | 10 | 841 | 1 |
| 10 | Rani Kamalapati (Habibganj) | RKMP | 07:22 | 07:24 | 02 | 590 | 2 | 20:58 | 21:00 | 02 | 835 | 1 |
| 11 | Itarsi Jn | ET | 08:55 | 09:00 | 05 | 675 | 2 | 19:25 | 19:30 | 05 | 749 | 1 |
| 12 | Khandwa Jn | KNW | 11:53 | 11:55 | 02 | 859 | 2 | 17:02 | 17:05 | 03 | 566 | 1 |
| 13 | Bhusawal Jn | BSL | 13:45 | 13:50 | 05 | 982 | 2 | 15:00 | 15:05 | 05 | 442 | 1 |
| 14 | Manmad Jn | MMR | 16:13 | 16:15 | 02 | 1166 | 2 | 12:33 | 12:35 | 02 | 258 | 1 |
| 15 | Nasik Road | NK | 17:18 | 17:23 | 03 | 1239 | 2 | 11:37 | 11:40 | 03 | 185 | 1 |
| 16 | Igatpuri | IGP | 18:22 | 18:27 | 05 | 1290 | 2 | 10:52 | 10:57 | 05 | 135 | 1 |
| 17 | Kalyan Jn | KYN | 20:07 | 20:10 | 03 | 1372 | 2 | 09:12 | 09:15 | 03 | 53 | 1 |
| 18 | Dadar Central | DR | 20:57 | 21:00 | 03 | 1416 | 2 | - | - | - | 9 | 1 |
| 19 | Mumbai CSMT | CSTM | 22:45 | Destination | - | 1425 | 2 | Source | 08:25 | - | 0 | 1 |

== Accidents ==
22 January – 2025 Jalgaon train accident: About 12 people including seven from Nepal were killed and 15 were injured when some of the passengers of Pushpak Express disembarked onto an adjacent railway line following a false fire alarm and were hit by the incoming Karnataka Express

== See also ==
- Pune–Lucknow Express
