= Jhansi railway division =

Railway division of India

Jhansi Railway Division is one of the three railway divisions under the jurisdiction of North Central Railway zone of the Indian Railways. This railway division was formed on 5 November 1951 and its headquarters are located at Jhansi in the state of Uttar Pradesh of India.

Prayagraj railway division and Agra railway division are the other two railway divisions under NCR Zone headquartered at Prayagraj.

List of Railway Stations under Amrit Bharat Station Scheme:

1. Virangana Laxmibai Jhansi Railway Station
2. Gwalior Railway Station
3. Khajuraho Railway Station
4. Bhind Railway Station
5. Morena Railway Station
6. Datia Railway Station
7. Lalitpur Railway Station
8. Orai Railway Station
9. Pukhrayan Railway Station
10. Gatampur Railway Station
11. Banda Railway Station
12. Chitrakutdham Karwi
13. Mahoba Railway Station
14. Harpalpur Railway Station
15. Orchha Railway Station
16. Maharaja Chhatrasal Railway Station
17. Tikamgarh railway station

== List of railway stations and towns ==
The list includes the stations under the Jhansi railway division and their station category.

Category of station	No. of stations	Names of stations
A-1	2	Virangana Lakshmibai, Gwalior Junction
A	6	Banda, Chitrakutdham Karwi, Morena, Lalitpur, Mahoba, Orai
B	-	-
C (Suburban Station)	-	-
D	-	-
E	-	-
F (Halt Station)	-	-
Total	-	-

Stations closed for Passengers - Gola ka mandir, Scindia ki chhavani, Morar, Hazira, Gwalior Kampoo kothi, Jivaji ganj and many other Gwalior suburban railway stations which belong to NG.
