= Mahoba Junction railway station =

Railway station in Mahoba, Uttar Pradesh, India

Mahoba Junction Railway Station

General information
- Location: Mahoba, Uttar Pradesh; India
- Coordinates: 25.3066°N 79.8482°E
- Elevation: 211 metres (692 ft)
- System: Indian Railways station
- Owner: Indian Railways
- Operator: North Central Railway
- Lines: VGL Jhansi–Banda section Mahoba–Khajuraho branch line
- Platforms: 3
- Tracks: 5
- Connections: Auto stand

Construction
- Structure type: At grade
- Parking: Yes
- Cycle facilities: Yes

Other information
- Status: Single electric line
- Station code: MBA
- Zone(s): North Central Railway
- Division(s): Jhansi

Services
Railwire Wifi by Railtel started at this station since Nov 2018
Location
- Location within India Location within Uttar Pradesh

Mahoba Junction railway station is a major railway station of Bundelkhand region in Mahoba district, Uttar Pradesh. Its code is MBA. It serves Mahoba city. The station is a Category A station of VGL Jhansi railway division of the North Central Railway zone.

The Mahoba–Khajuraho branch line was inaugurated on 26 December 2008 by then Minister of Railways Lalu Prasad Yadav, and the Khajuraho–VGLJ Link Express was the first train run on this track. On the same day Khajuraho railway station also inaugurated. The first train to pass through this rail line was Khajuraho VGLJ Link Express (train no. 230A). Facts about train line:

- Length: 65.15 km
- Cost: 130 crore
- First train: Khajuraho–Jhansi Link Express (train no. 230A)

It is a part of North Central Railway, PRAYAGRAJ.

== Trains ==
- Mahakaushal Express
- Bundelkhand Express
- Uttar Pradesh Sampark Kranti Express
- Tulsi Express
- Khajuraho–Kanpur Passenger
- Mahoba–Khajauraho Passenger
- Khajuraho–Udaipur City Express
- Chambal Express
- Howrah–Mathura Chambal Express
