= Banda railway station =

Railway station in Uttar Pradesh, India

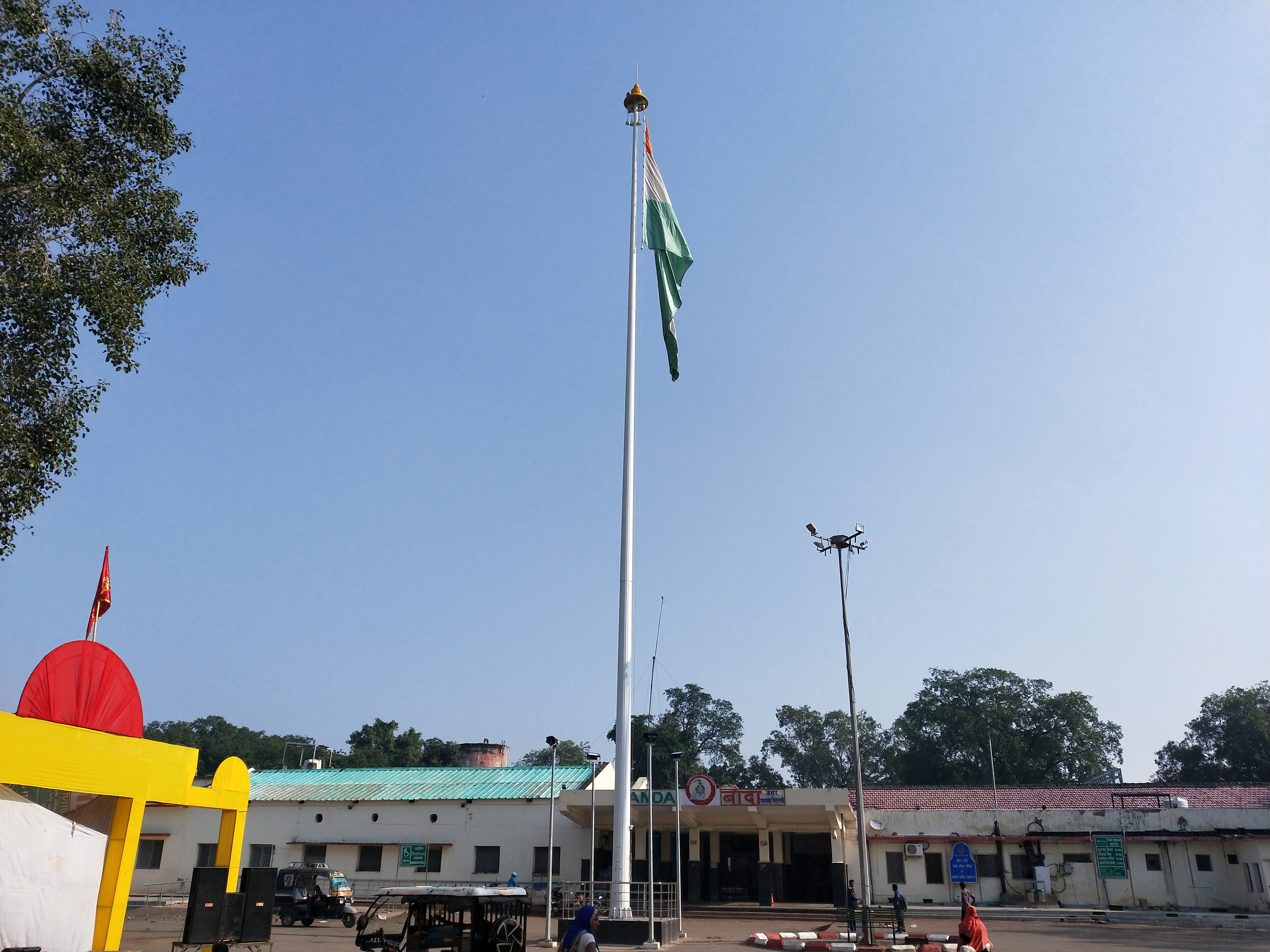

General information
- Location: Banda, Uttar Pradesh; India
- Coordinates: 25.4777°N 80.3349°E
- Elevation: 387 metres (1,270 ft)
- System: Express train and Passenger train station
- Owner: Indian Railways
- Operator: North Central Railway zone
- Platforms: 2
- Tracks: 4
- Connections: Auto stand

Construction
- Structure type: At grade
- Parking: Yes
- Cycle facilities: No

Other information
- Status: Single-Line Electric
- Station code: BNDA
- Zone(s): North Central Railway zone
- Division(s): Jhansi

Services
Preceding station	Indian Railways	Following station
Khairar Junction towards ?	West Central Railway zone Khairar–Ohan branch line	Dingwahi towards ?
Location
- Location within India Location within Uttar Pradesh

Banda railway station is a grade A railway station in Banda district, Uttar Pradesh. It is served by the Chambal Express.

Free rail wire Wifi by Railtel is available at this station. The station is equipped with IP Based CCTV camera. Its code is BNDA. It serves Banda town.

== Infrastructure ==
The station consists of three platforms. Wi-fi is available in the station. The station is a Category A station of Jhansi railway division of the North Central Railway zone.
