= Chitrakutdham Karwi railway station =

Railway station in India

Chitrakutdham Karwi

General information
- Location: Chitrakoot Dham (Karwi), Uttar Pradesh; India
- Coordinates: 25.217464°N 80.922639°E
- Elevation: 142 metres (466 ft)
- System: Express train and Passenger train station
- Owner: Indian Railways
- Operator: North Central Railways
- Platforms: 3
- Tracks: 3
- Connections: Auto stand

Construction
- Structure type: At grade
- Parking: Yes
- Cycle facilities: No

Other information
- Status: Functioning
- Station code: CKTD
- Zone(s): North Central Railway zone
- Division(s): Jhansi

Services
| Preceding station | Indian Railways | Following station |
|---|---|---|
| Shivrampur towards ? | North Central Railway zone Khairar–Ohan branch line | Khoh towards ? |
Location
- Location within Uttar Pradesh Location within India

Chitrakutdham Karwi railway station is a grade A railway station in Chitrakoot district, Uttar Pradesh. Its code is CKTD. It serves Chitrakoot Dham (Karwi) town.
