= Jhansi Junction railway station =

Railway station in Uttar Pradesh, India

JHANSI JUNCTION

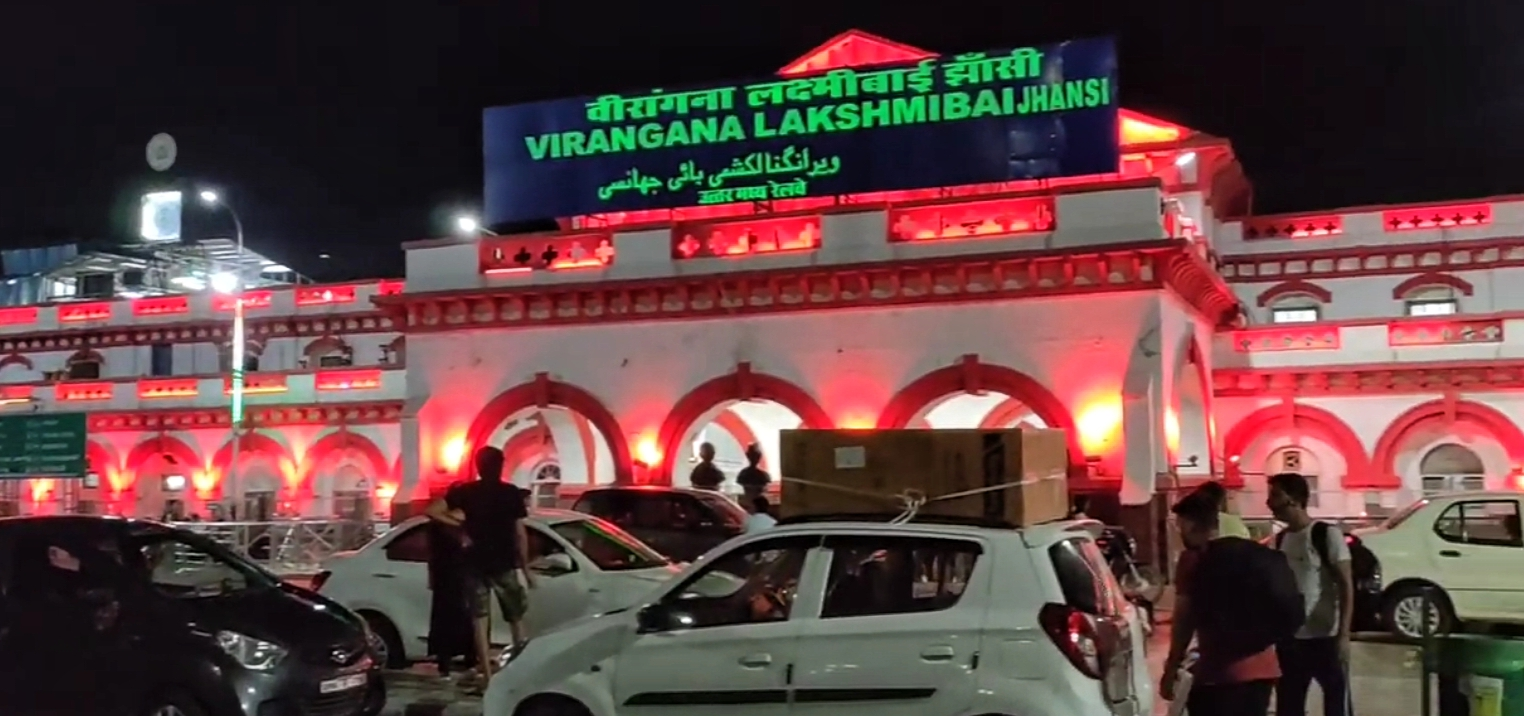
- Main entrance of the railway station

General information
- Location: Lal Bahadur Shastri Marg, Jhansi, Uttar Pradesh – 284001; India
- Coordinates: 25°26′38″N 78°33′12″E
- Elevation: 260 metres (850 ft)
- System: Indian Railways
- Owner: Indian Railways
- Operator: North Central Railway zone
- Lines: New Delhi–Chennai main line; Jhansi–Kanpur section; Jhansi–Manikpur section; Jhansi– Shivpuri–Sheopur–Sawai Madhopur railway line (Proposed)
- Platforms: 8 (2 additional platforms proposed)
- Tracks: 13
- Connections: Local city buses, auto-rickshaws, and private taxis

Construction
- Structure type: At grade
- Parking: Yes
- Cycle facilities: Yes
- Accessible: Available

Other information
- Status: Operating
- Station code: VGLJ (formerly JHS)
- Zone(s): North Central Railway zone
- Division(s): Jhansi railway division

History
- Opened: 1889
- Electrified: 1986–1987
- Former names: Jhansi Junction (1889–2021)
Location
- Interactive map location

Jhansi Junction railway station (officially Virangana Lakshmibai Jhansi Railway Station, station code: VGLJ) is a major railway junction in the city of Jhansi in Bundelkhand region of Uttar Pradesh. It is a technical halt for various trains of Indian Railways.

It operates under the Jhansi railway division of the North Central Railway zone of Indian Railways. Positioned at the intersection of major north–south and east–west rail routes across Central India, it serves as an essential operational hub and technical halt for dozens of high-priority express trains.

== History ==
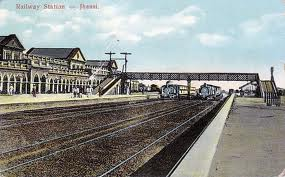
The station building in the late 19th century

The railway station was constructed by the British administration in the late 1880s following extensive surveys to select an optimal junction for Central India's expanding rail network. The main station building features a distinctive, fort-like architectural design painted in maroon and off-white.

During historical times, the region was known as Balwant Nagar under the Chandela dynasty before losing regional dominance in the 11th century. The settlement regained geopolitical significance in 1613 when Raja Bir Singh Deo of Orchha constructed the Jhansi Fort.

Upon opening, the station operated with three platforms. Platform 1 measures 2,525 feet (770 m) in length, making it one of the longest continuous platforms in India, capable of handling two full-length passenger trains simultaneously.

Jhansi railway station initially served as the headquarters and focal operational center for the Indian Midland Railway, which constructed radial rail links originating from Jhansi and operated a major locomotive and carriage maintenance workshop adjacent to the station.

=== Renaming ===
On 1 January 2022, the station was officially renamed from Jhansi Junction to Virangana Lakshmibai Jhansi in honor of Rani Lakshmibai, the 19th-century ruler of Jhansi who played a prominent role in the Indian Rebellion of 1857.

Following the official notification, the primary station booking code was transitioned from `JHS` to `VGLJ` (after a brief temporary assignment of `VGLB`).

== Operational structure and routes ==
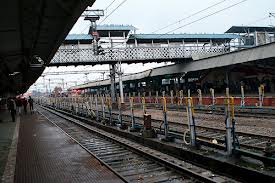
Platform view at Jhansi station

The station connects major Indian metropolises, including New Delhi, Mumbai, Bengaluru, Kolkata, Chennai, Hyderabad, Lucknow, Ahmedabad, Pune, and Jaipur.

The station serves four broad-gauge trunk lines:

1. Delhi–Jhansi section (North-bound)
2. Jhansi–Bhopal section (South-bound)
3. Jhansi–Kanpur section (East-bound)
4. Jhansi–Manikpur section (South-east towards Prayagraj)

A survey was initiated for a proposed line connecting Jhansi to Shivpuri in Madhya Pradesh, intended to extend connectivity onward toward Sawai Madhopur and Jaipur.

=== Key train services ===
The station handles over 250 passenger and express trains daily, including flagship non-stop and high-speed services:

- Gatimaan Express: Serves as a primary terminal for India's semi-high-speed service connecting Jhansi to Hazrat Nizamuddin (Delhi).
- Vande Bharat Express: Stoppage point for high-speed Vande Bharat trains running along the New Delhi–Bhopal corridor.
- Shatabdi Express and Rajdhani Express: Serves multiple pairs of Rajdhani Express trains and the New Delhi–Rani Kamlapati Shatabdi Express.
- Taj Express, Pushpak Express, Kerala Express, Karnataka Express, Tamil Nadu Express, Bhopal Express, and Bundelkhand Express.

== Facilities ==
- Platforms: The station currently operates 8 passenger platforms equipped with foot overbridges (FOBs), escalators, and lifts. Two additional platforms are planned to accommodate increasing traffic.
- Amenities: Executive waiting lounges, Class-I and Class-II AC and non-AC waiting quarters, cloakrooms, and digital reservation counters.
- Connectivity: High-speed public Wi-Fi powered by RailWire.
- Dining and Retailing: On-platform food courts, multi-cuisine dining facilities, IRCTC refreshment stalls, and branded retail stalls.
- Tourism Support: Help desks operated by Uttar Pradesh Tourism and Madhya Pradesh Tourism catering to passengers traveling onward to UNESCO World Heritage sites like Khajuraho and historic towns such as Orchha.

== Loco sheds ==
Jhansi houses major locomotive maintenance complexes operated by the Indian Railways, combining both electric and diesel facilities:

- Electric Loco Shed, Jhansi: Maintains a sanctioned capacity of over 150 electric locomotives, primarily servicing freight and high-speed passenger haulers.
- Diesel Loco Shed, Jhansi: Services high-horsepower diesel-electric locomotives utilized across non-electrified routes and heavy freight corridors.

Diesel Loco Shed Inventory
Serial No.	Locomotive Class	Horsepower	Active Holding
1.	WDG-3A	3100	25
2.	WDM-3D	3300	27
3.	WDG-4 / WDG-4D	4000 / 4500	70
4.	WDP-4 / WDP-4B / WDP-4D	4000 / 4500	8
5.	WAG-9	6120	1
Total Active Locomotives			131
