= North Central Railway zone =

Zone of Indian Railways

North Central Railway

Overview
- Headquarters: Prayagraj
- Locale: North-Central India
- Dates of operation: 2003; 23 years ago–present
- Predecessor: Northern Railway zone Central Railway zone

Technical
- Track gauge: Mixed
- Length: 3,062 kilometres (1,903 mi)

Other
- Website: ncr.indianrailways.gov.in

The North Central Railway (abbreviated NCR) is one of the 19 railway zones in India. The largest railway station in NCR is Kanpur Central. It is headquartered at Prayagraj and comprises three divisions: Prayagraj, Jhansi, and Agra of the erstwhile Northern Railway, Jhansi division of the erstwhile Central Railway, and new Agra division.

== History ==
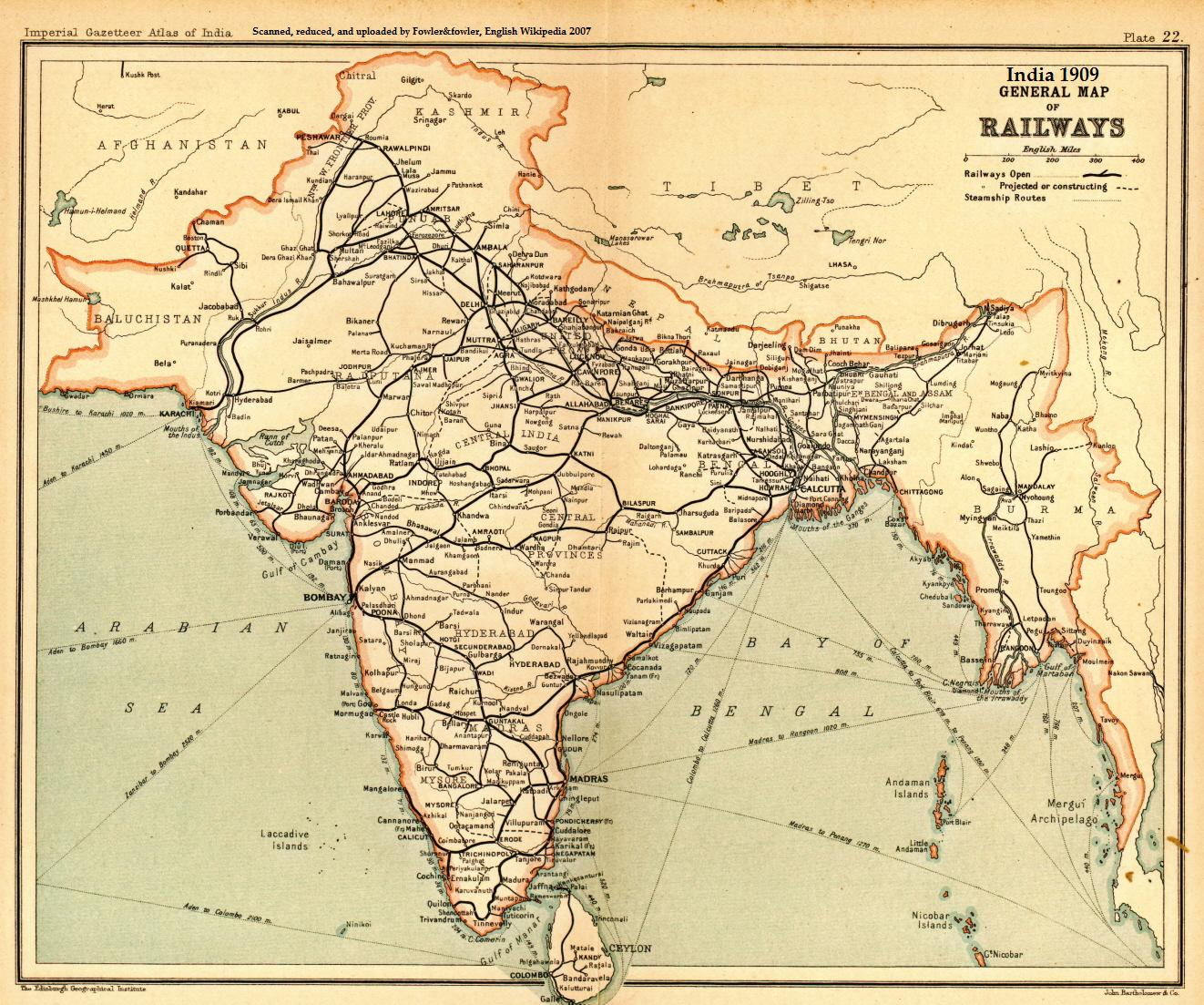
Extent of the Indian railway network in 1909

The North Central Railway, in its present form, came into existence on 3 April 2003. The North Central Railway's present network extends over a large area of North Central India, covering the states of Delhi, Uttar Pradesh, Madhya Pradesh, Rajasthan and Haryana.

By December 2017, railways for the first time installed 6,095 GPS-enabled "Fog Pilot Assistance System" railway signalling devices in four most affected zones, Northern Railway zone, North Central Railway zone, North Eastern Railway zone and North Western Railway zone, by doing away with the old practice of putting firecrackers on train tracks to alter train divers running trains on snail's pace. With these devices, train pilots precisely know in advance, about the location of signals, level-crossing gates and other such approaching markers.

In 2022, the North Central Railway Zone achieved 100% electrification of its network.

== Divisions ==
Serving the heartland of India, the North Central Railways comprises the following three divisions.

1. Prayagraj railway division
2. Jhansi railway division
3. Agra railway division

== Area covered ==
The zone spreads across all three divisions mentioned above. It extends from Ghaziabad (excl.) in the north to Mughalsarai (excl.) in the east on New Delhi-Howrah trunk route and from Palwal (excl.) to Bina (excl.) on New Delhi Mumbai/Chennai corridor. North Central Railway span parts of UP, Haryana, Rajasthan and Madhya Pradesh with about 3062 route km of BG comprising predominantly double line- electrified sections defining the sides and diagonals of the Golden Quadrilateral. NCR consists of 202 main line stations & 221 branch line stations. This zone forms a corridor for trains almost directions viz. East to north and north to east a total of 29 pairs of mail-express trains daily west/south to north and north to south/west total 37 pairs of M/Exp. Trains daily east to Southwest and southwest to east a total of 25 pairs of Mail/Express trains daily East to West & West to East a total of 12 pairs of Mail/Express Trains Daily.

== Major stations ==
Category of station	No. of stations	Names of stations
A-1 Category	6	Prayagraj Junction, Gwalior Junction, Kanpur Central, Mathura Junction, Agra Cantonment, Jhansi Junction
A Category	15	Tundla, Aligarh, Morena, Etawah, Fatehpur, Phaphund, Mirzapur, Banda, Chitrakutdham Karwi, Lalitpur, Mahoba, Orai, Agra Fort, Raja ki Mandi
B Category	-	-
C Category (Suburban station)	-	-
D Category	-	-
E Category	-	-
F Category Halt Station	-	-
Total	-	-

== Major trains ==
1. Shram Shakti Express, New Delhi – Kanpur Central
2. Prayagraj Express, New Delhi - Prayagraj Jn
3. Kanpur–New Delhi Shatabdi Express, New Delhi – Kanpur Central
4. Prayagraj–New Delhi Humsafar Express, New Delhi – Prayagraj Jn
5. Prayagraj–Anand Vihar Terminal Humsafar Express, Anand Vihar Terminal – Prayagraj Jn
6. Kanpur Central–Anand Vihar Terminal Express, Anand Vihar Terminal – Kanpur Central
7. Chambal Express, Howrah Jn – Gwalior Jn/Mathura Jn

== Workshop and manpower ==
There are two workshops on the North Central Railway. The Wagon Repair Workshop in Jhansi deals with the repairing of wagon stock of Indian Railways and was established in 1895. Rail Spring Karkhana, Sithouli, and Gwalior deals with manufacturing of Coaching Stock springs as well as Locomotive springs. The NCR also has an electric loco shed where the damaged engines of Magadh Express is fitted with modern technology to run the Delhi-Howrah Duronto Express. The NCR has 69,644 staff members. NCR in its effort to boost use of solar power under National Solar Mission has selected Vivaan Solar, a company from Gwalior to install a total of 1.5 MW rooftop solar power project at the wagon repair workshop of Jhansi Junction railway station. The company will install rooftop solar panels on production sheds and service buildings of the complex.

== Loco sheds ==
- Electric Loco Shed, Kanpur
- Electric Loco Shed, Jhansi
- Diesel Loco Shed, Jhansi

== Gallery ==
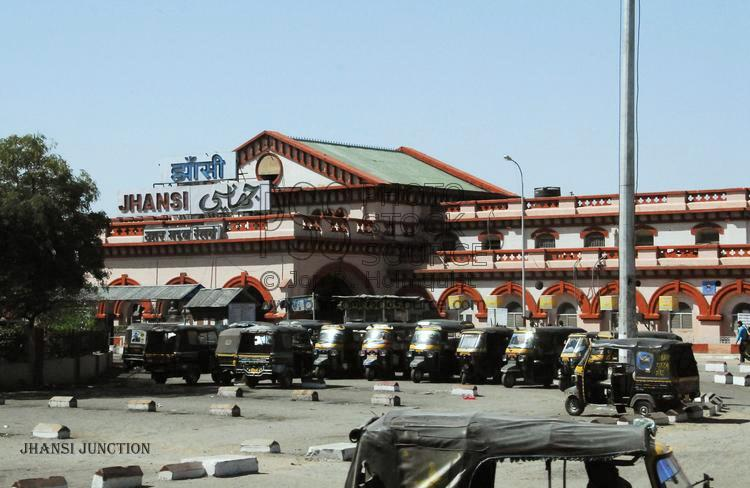
Jhansi Junction Railway Station

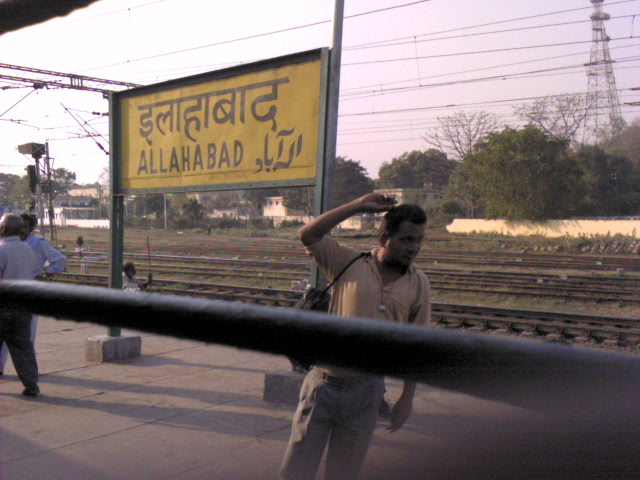
Allahabad Railway Station

== See also ==
- All India Station Masters' Association (AISMA)
- Zones and divisions of Indian Railways
