= Duraundha–Masrakh section =

Railway line in India

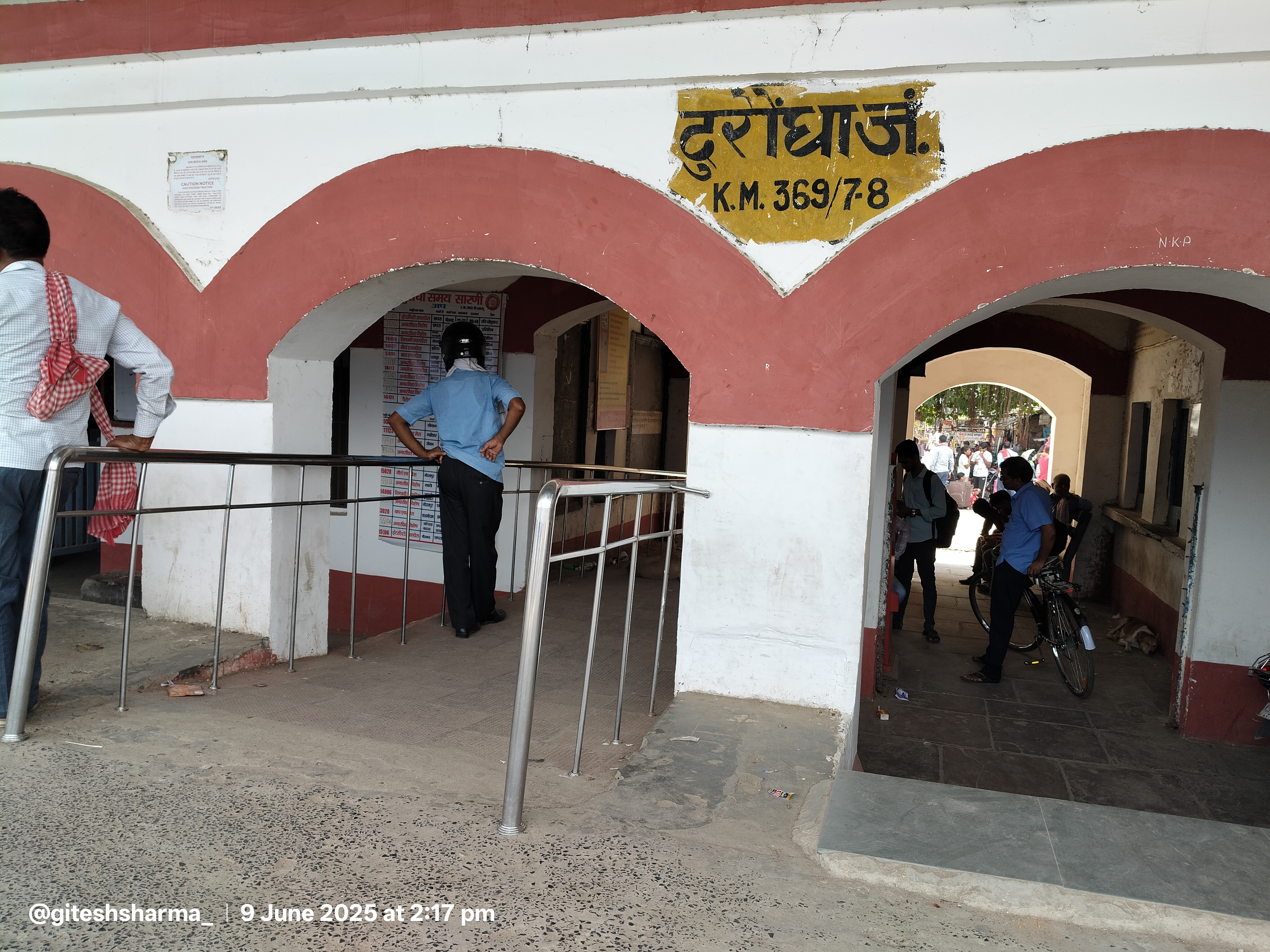

Overview
- Other name: Duraundha–Maharajganj line
- Status: Operational
- Owner: Indian Railways; Ministry of Railways, Government of India
- Locale: Bihar
- Termini: Duraundha Junction; Masrakh Junction
- Stations: 8

Service
- Type: Passenger and freight
- Services: Barauni–Gorakhpur line
- Operator: North Eastern Railway
- Depot(s): Duraundha and Mashrakh
- Rolling stock: Diesel locomotives: WDM-2, WDM-3A, WDS-5, WDP-4, and WDG-4

History
- Opened: 9 September 2019; 7 years ago

Technical
- Line length: 42 km (26 mi)
- Track length: 42.58 km (26.46 mi)
- Num of tracks: Single line (electrified)
- Track gauge: 5 ft 6 in (1,676 mm) broad gauge
- Electrification: 25 kV 50 Hz AC OHLE
- Operating speed: 110 km/h (68 mph)
- Highest elevation: 64.2 m (211 ft)

The Duraundha–Masrakh section (formerly the Duraundha–Maharajganj line) is a railway line connecting Duraundha Junction and Masrakh Junction via Maharajganj in the Indian state of Bihar. The 42 km (26 mi) line passes through the plains of North Bihar and connects with the Barauni–Gorakhpur line.
