= Hazrat Nizamuddin–Gwalior Express =

Former train of Indian Railways

Hazrat Nizamuddin-Gwalior Express
Overview
- Service type: Superfast
- Locale: Delhi, Haryana, Uttar Pradesh, Rajasthan & Madhya Pradesh
- Current operator(s): North Central Railway

Route
- Termini: Hazrat Nizamuddin; Gwalior Junction
- Stops: 3
- Distance travelled: 306 km (190 mi)
- Average journey time: 4 hours
- Service frequency: Daily
- Train number(s): Cancelled

On-board services
- Class(es): AC First Class, AC 2 Tier, AC 3 Tier, Chair Car, General Unreserved
- Seating arrangements: Yes
- Sleeping arrangements: Yes
- Auto-rack arrangements: Overhead racks
- Catering facilities: available
- Observation facilities: Large windows
- Entertainment facilities: Yes
- Baggage facilities: Available
- Other facilities: Below the seats

Technical
- Rolling stock: ICF coach
- Track gauge: Broad Gauge
- Operating speed: 60 km/h (37 mph) average including halts.

The Hazrat Nizamuddin–Gwalior Express was a express train of Indian Railways, which used to run between Hazrat Nizamuddin railway station of Delhi, the capital city of India and Gwalior Junction railway station of Gwalior, the princely city and educational hub of the Central Indian state Madhya Pradesh. The train was India's fifth ISO Certified train.

The train is no longer operational, running through Hazrat Nizamuddin and up to Jhansi's Taj Express.

== Arrival and departure ==
Train number 12180 departed from Hazrat Nizamuddin everyday at 06:30am IST from platform number 5, reaching Gwalior at around 10:40am IST.

== Route and halts ==
- NIZAMUDDIN
- Agra Cantt.
- GWALIOR JUNCTION

== Coach composite ==
The train consisted of 20 coaches:

- 1 AC I Tier
- 2 AC II Tiers
- 3 AC III Tiers
- 6 Sleeper cum chair car Coaches
- 4 Unreserved chair cars
- 2 Ladies/Handicapped
- 2 Luggage/Brake Vans

== Average speed and frequency ==
The train ran with an average speed of 63 km/h.

== Loco link ==
The train was hauled by Ghaziabad WAP 5 Electric engine.

== Trivia ==
The train was extended to Jhansi's Taj Express, with a numbering change taking place along with that extension.

== See also ==
- Narmada Express
- Indore Junction
- Bhopal Junction
