= Duraundha Junction railway station =

Railway station in Siwan, Bihar, India

Duraundha Junction दुरौंधा जंक्शन
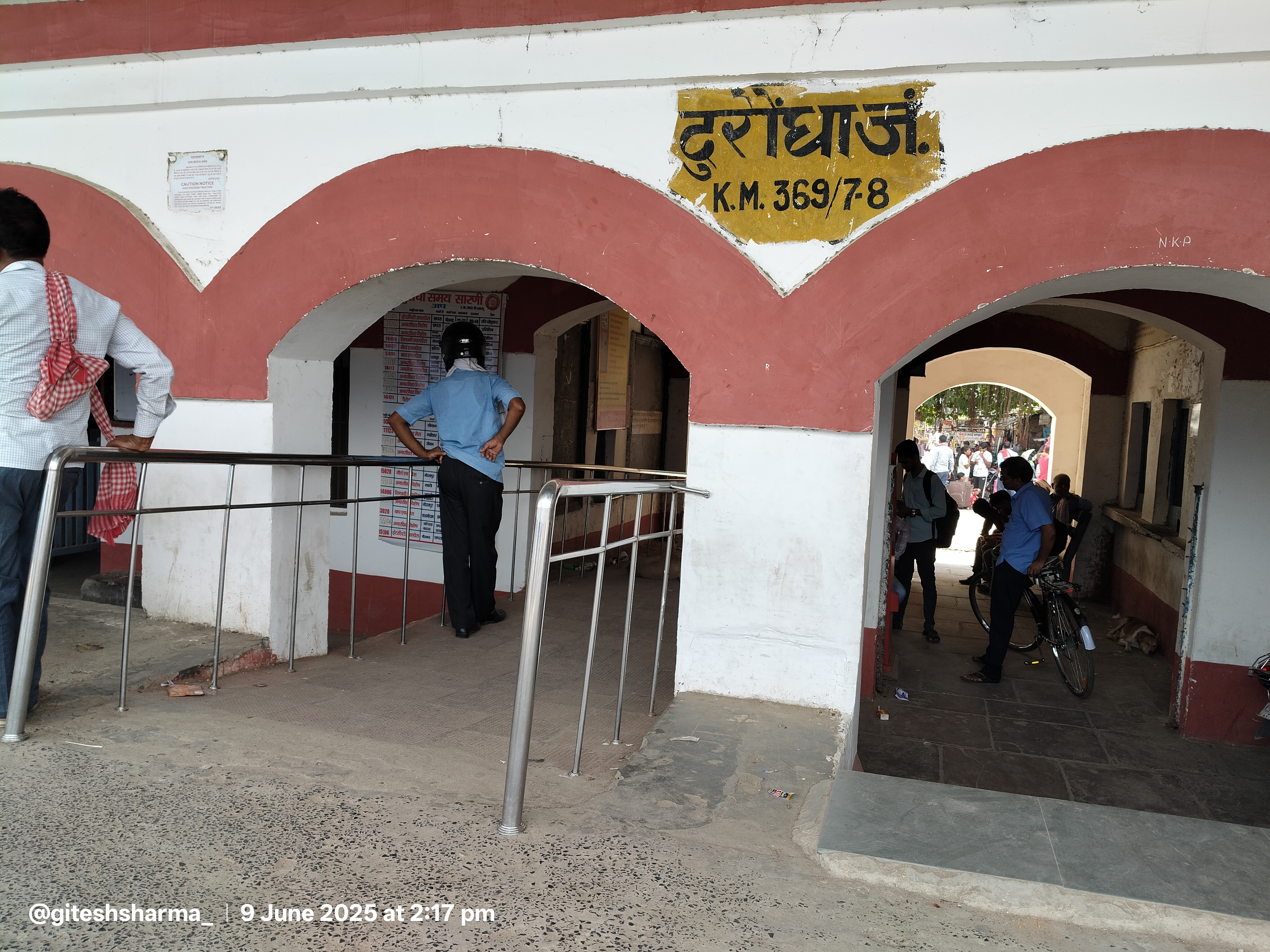

General information
- Location: NH-85, Daraundha, Siwan district, Bihar, 841235; India
- Coordinates: 26.51309°N 84.27322°E
- Elevation: 64.2 m (211 ft)
- System: Indian Railways station
- Owner: Indian Railways; Ministry of Railways, Government of India
- Operator: North Eastern Railway zone
- Lines: Barauni–Gorakhpur line Duraundha–Maharajganj line
- Platforms: 3
- Tracks: 5
- Connections: NH 27

Construction
- Structure type: Standard (on ground station)/At grade
- Parking: Taxicab stand, Auto rickshaw stand & Bicycle
- Cycle facilities: yes
- Accessible: Available

Other information
- Status: Active/Operational
- Station code: DDA
- Zone(s): North Eastern Railway zone
- Division(s): Varanasi
- Classification: NSG-4

History
- Opened: 1 April 1907; 119 years ago
- Rebuilt: 2006; 20 years ago (Broad Gauge Conversion)
- Electrified: 2018; 8 years ago
- Former names: Daronda; East Indian Railway
Services
Preceding station	Indian Railways	Following station
Siwan Junction towards ?	North Eastern Railway zone Barauni–Gorakhpur line	Chhapra Junction towards ?
Maharajganj Junction towards ?	North Eastern Railway zone Duraundha–Maharajganj line	Duraundha Junction towards ?
Route map
Location
- Location within India Location within Bihar
- Interactive map

Duraundha Junction railway station (station code: DDA), is a railway station located in the city of Daraundha, district of Siwan, Bihar, India.

== History ==
Duraundha Junction embodies a microcosm of India's railway heritage. Earlier when its name was Daronda, then it was in the Bengal & North Western Railway Loop line which was started in 1882 as Bengal and North Western Railway by the East Indian Railways. Then when the fight for independence was going on, it was changed to Oudh and Tirhut Railway on 1 January 1943. After independence, zone jurisdiction was imposed and now it is in the North zone of Indian Railways from 14 April 1952.

Year	Railway Administration	Notes
1882	Bengal & NW Railway	Station established on metre-gauge branch
1943	Oudh & Tirhut Railway	Amalgamation expanded operational network
1952	North Eastern Railway	Present-day jurisdiction established

== Rail services ==
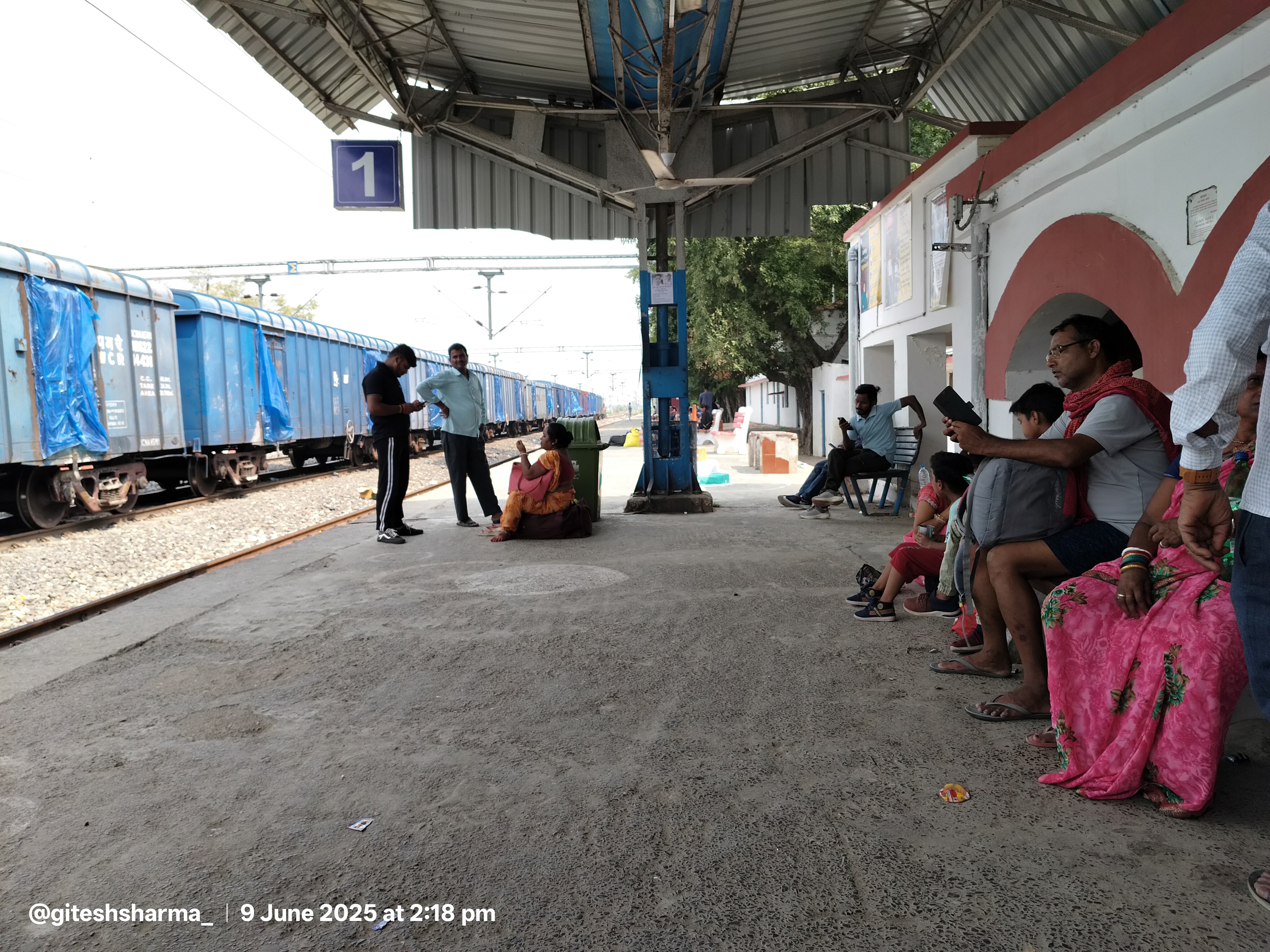
Platform No. 1, Duraundha JN.

The North Eastern Railway runs local trains in between Chhapra to Siwan via Duraundha and Maharajganj.

== Jurisdiction ==
It belongs to the Varanasi railway division of the North Eastern Railway Zone of Siwan district in Bihar. The station code is DDA.

== Facilities ==
The major facilities are mechanised cleaning, available are waiting rooms, computerised reservation facility, reservation counter, vehicle parking, electrified double track and ATVM (Automatic Ticket Vending Machines).

=== Platforms ===
There are three platforms which are interconnected with foot overbridge (FOB) including five rail tracks.

== Line ==
These are the line in which Duraundha Junction comes.

- Barauni–Gorakhpur line
- Siwan-Gorakhpur Line
- Siwan-Chhapra-Patliputra Line
- Siwan-Thawe-Kaptanganj Line
- Duraundha–Maharajganj line

== Trains ==
The names of some trains that stop here are as follows.

=== Express/Mail Trains ===
- Lichchavi Express
- Maurya Express
- Barauni–Gwalior Mail
- Bagh Express
- Purnia Court–Amritsar Jan Sewa Express

=== Passenger/DMU ===
- Samastipur Siwan Passenger
- Chhapra Gorakhpur Passenger
- Chhapra Kacheri Thawe Passenger
- Chhapra Kacheri Mau Passenger
- Mashrakh Thawe Passenger
- Samastipur Siwan DEMU
- Chhapra Thawe DEMU
