= Gwalior Junction railway station =

Railway station in Gwalior, Madhya Pradesh, India

GWALIOR JUNCTION

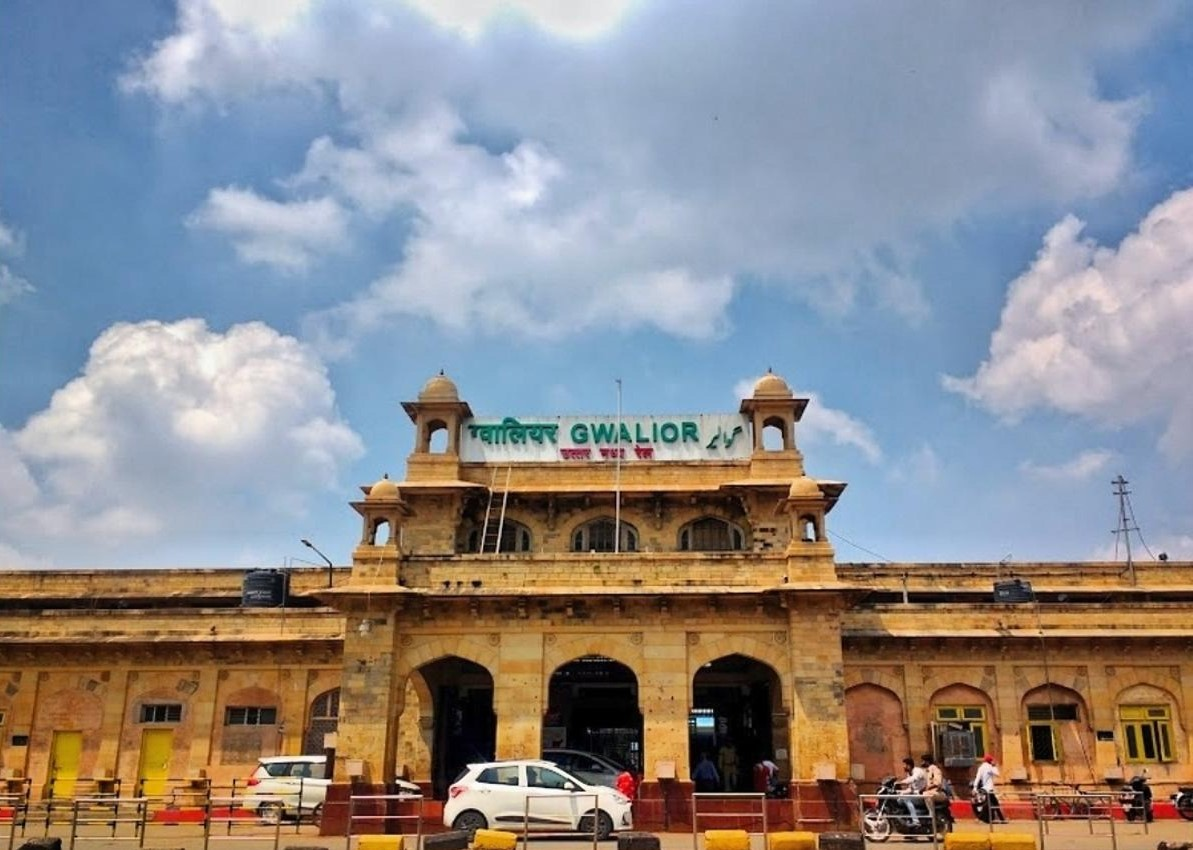
- Main Entrance of Gwalior Junction Railway Station

General information
- Location: The Loco, Racecourse Road, Gwalior, Madhya Pradesh; India
- Coordinates: 26°12′58″N 78°10′55″E
- Elevation: 211.52 m (694.0 ft)
- System: Indian Railways station
- Owner: Indian Railways
- Operator: North Central Railway Zone
- Lines: New Delhi–Chennai main line, Agra–Gwalior Section, Gwalior-Indore line, Gwalior-Kota line, Gwalior-Kanpur line
- Platforms: 6
- Tracks: 16
- Connections: Taxi Stand, Auto Stand, E-rickshaw

Construction
- Structure type: At grade
- Parking: Available
- Cycle facilities: Yes
- Accessible: Available

Other information
- Status: Functioning
- Station code: GWL
- Zone(s): North Central Railway zone
- Division(s): Jhansi

History
- Opened: 1878; 148 years ago
- Rebuilt: 1940; 86 years ago

Passengers
- Avg 1,00,000/day
- Computerized Ticketing Counters Parking Disabled Access WC Auto Stand
Location
- Location within Madhya Pradesh
- Interactive map

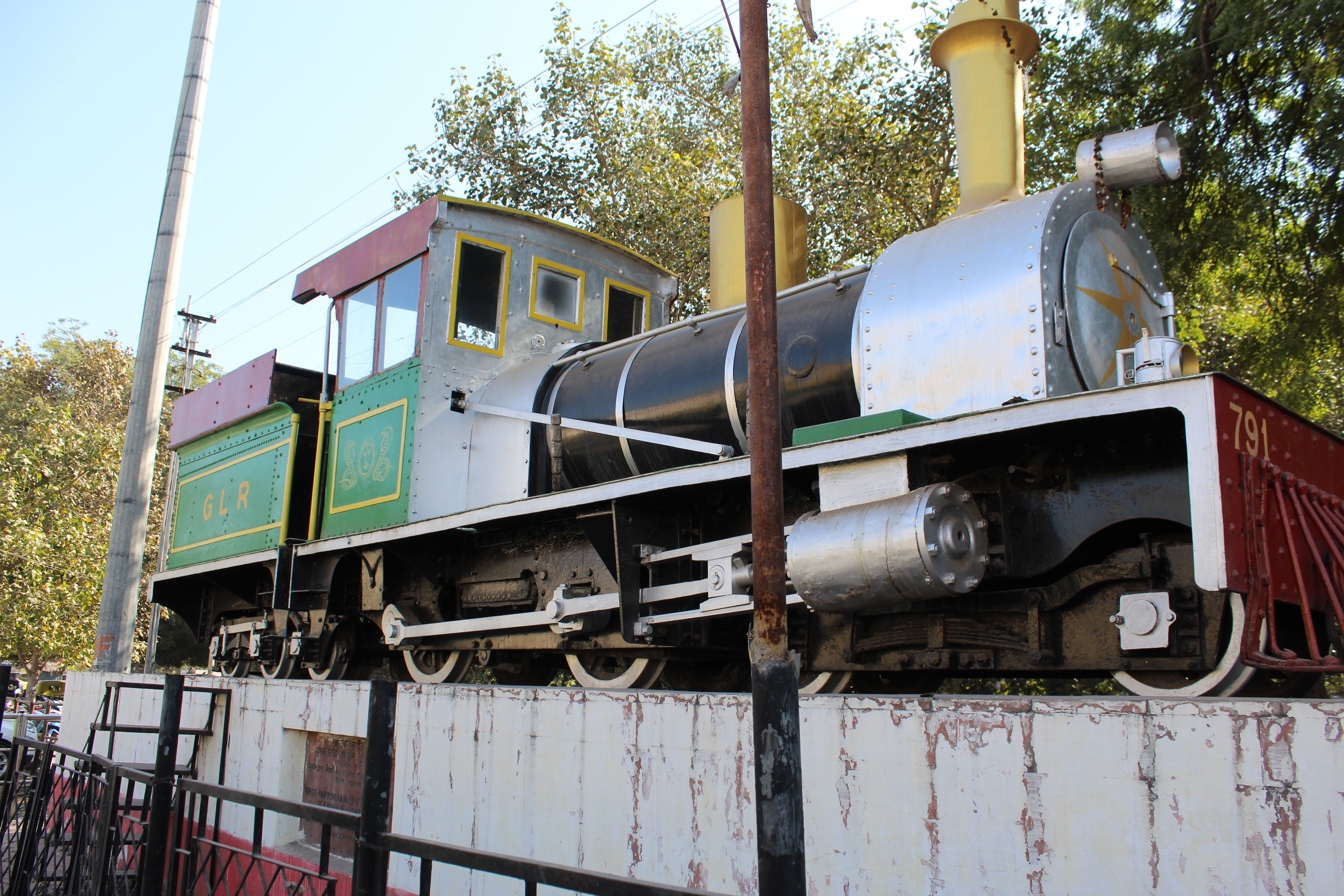

Gwalior Junction Railway Station (station code: GWL) is a major and main railway Junction of Gwalior City along with Birlanagar and Sithouli railway stations in the northern part of the Indian state of Madhya Pradesh. Gwalior Junction is the busiest and an important commercial junction of Bundelkhand region that connects different remote parts of Rajasthan, Madhya Pradesh and Uttar Pradesh also known as the crown of Bundelkhand, and it comes under the administrative control of North Central Railway Zone of Indian Railways. It lies on the main Delhi–Chennai and one of the Delhi–Mumbai lines.

== History ==
Gwalior Junction Railway Station came into existence with the formation of the Agra-Gwalior rail section which was completed in 1881. After that Gwalior Station was transferred to the Indian Midland Railway. Later this section was operated by G.I.P. Railways. Maharaja Madho Rao Scindia laid a light narrow gauge rail line in his territory in 1899 between Gwalior-Bhind, Gwalior-Shivpuri, and in 1904 from Gwalior to Sabalgarh and in 1909 from Sabalgarh to Sheopur Kalan, which became known as Gwalior Light Railway. The Gwalior narrow-gauge track was the narrowest in India. The station had also won awards from Indian Railways for clean infrastructure in 1987, 1988, 1989, and 1992.

== Services ==
Gwalior Junction lies on the New Delhi–Chennai main line and New Delhi - Mumbai line along with 3 lines originating from here namely 1. Gwalior - Indore Main Line, 2. Gwalior - Kota Line (formerly known as the Maharaja Line) and 3. Gwalior - Etawah - Kanpur Line of the Indian Railways which halts more than 200 daily trains, and 18 trains originates from here serving more than 1,00,000 (One Lac) passengers a day. Express trains such as the Rajdhani Express, Shatabdi Express, Gatimaan Express, Humsafar Express, Duronto Express, Sampark Kranti trains, Garib Rath Express,Taj Express as well as Vande Bharat Express Trains which are India's semi-highspeed trains, stops here. Notable originating and terminus include the Chambal Superfast Express, Sushasan SF Express, Bundelkhand Express, Gwalior - Daund Superfast Express, Bhopal-Gwalior Intercity Express, Ratlam-Gwalior Intercity Express, Gwalior - Sabarmati Superfast Express, Kolkata - Gwalior Superfast Express, Barauni-Gwalior Mail, Gwalior - SMVT Bengaluru Express and Gwalior Prayagraj Express.

Narrow-gauge train operation of Gwalior-Sheopur Kalan line closed in 2020 and now this section is under conversion to 1,676 mm (5 ft 6 in) broad gauge line.

== Redevelopment ==
The Gwalior Junction railway station has been proposed to be redeveloped at a cost of approximately ₹ 290 crores under the station redevelopment program by the Indian Railway Stations Development Corporation Ltd (IRSDC). Entry, exit, and block areas have been proposed to be redeveloped being in contrast with the heritage building in an area of approximately 9,840 square metres (105,900 sq ft). It is one among the four new railway stations which had been finalized for redevelopment based on the public-private partnership (PPP) model. According to IRSDC, the in-principle approval for inviting the request for quotation (RFQ) for the redevelopment of the railway station based on the PPP model was granted by the Public-Private Partnership Appraisal Committee (PPPAC) on 20 December 2019. The proposed area of the redevelopment of the station is approximately 230,425 m^{2} (2,480,270 sq ft) with a proposed cost of around 240 crores, and will highlight the unique heritage building.

== Connectivity ==
Gwalior Junction is well-connected to all parts of the country via train like New Delhi, Mumbai, Vijayawada, Kota, Jaipur, Bhopal, Jabalpur, Indore, Lucknow, Chennai, Bangalore,Bareilly,Hyderabad, Pune, Kolkata, Jammu, Puri, Bhubaneswar, Ahmedabad, Amritsar, Ujjain, Dehradun, and Thiruvananthapuram.

Gwalior Junction served passengers by five broad-gauge routes:

- To Agra–New Delhi
- To Gwalior–Bhopal
- To Guna–Ujjain-Godhra
- To Bhind–Etawah-Kanpur
- To Sabalgarh-Sheopur Kalan- Kota (Under Broad-gauge conversion)
