= Rail Spring Karkhana =

Coordinates: 26.14353°N 78.18661°E

The Rail Spring Karkhana (Rail Spring Factory) (Hindi: रेल स्प्रिंग कारखाना), located near Sithouli Railway Station around 12.8 km way from Gwalior Railway Station Gwalior in the Indian state of Madhya Pradesh. It is a major railway workshop for Indian Railways which manufacture Hot Coil Springs of different types for diverse Rolling Stocks.
