= Morena railway station =

Railway station in Madhya Pradesh, India

Morena Railway Station Morena Railway station. मुरैना रेलवे स्टेशन

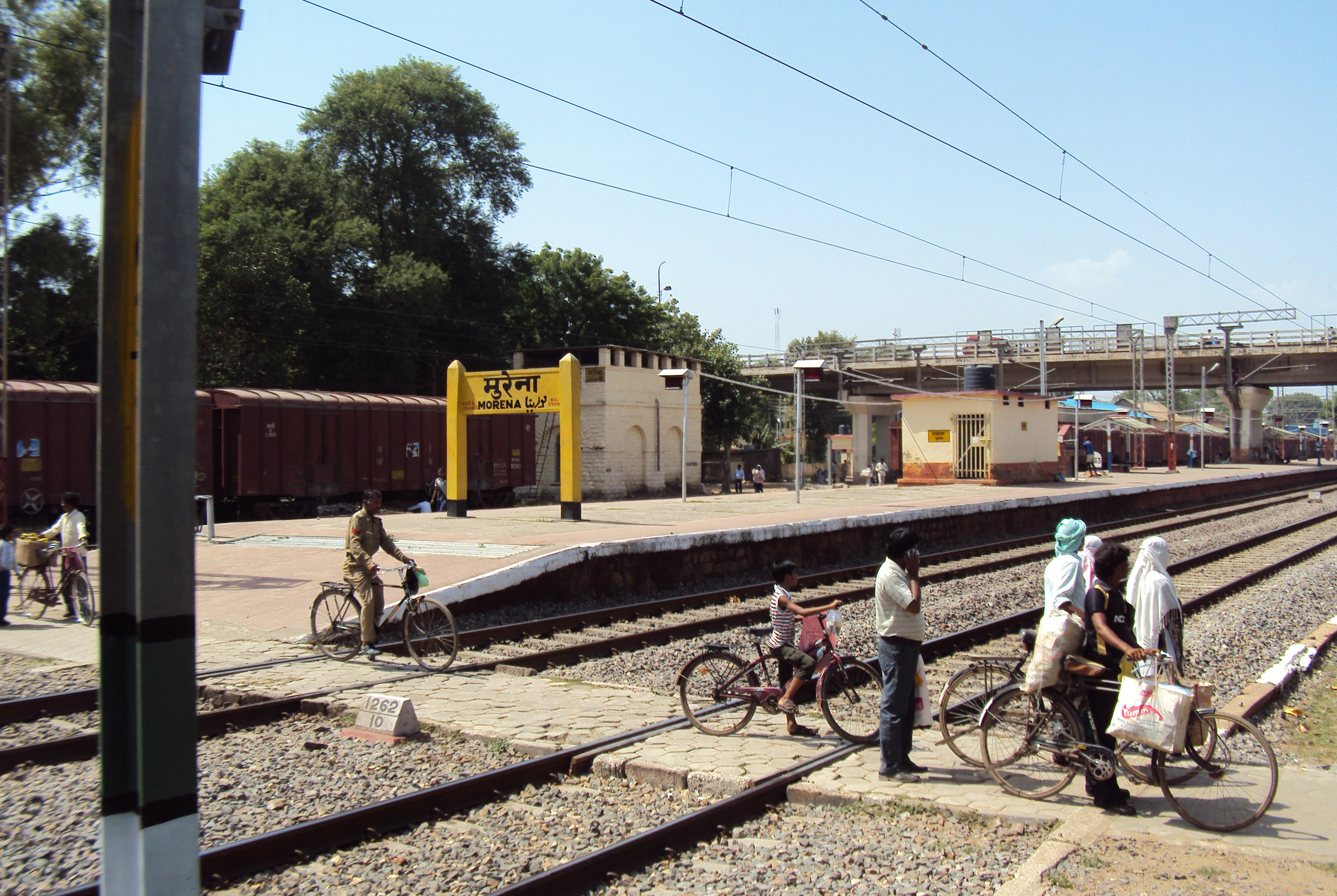
- Morena Railway Station

General information
- Location: SH 2, Station Road, Morena, Madhya Pradesh; Morena Madhya Pradesh; India
- Coordinates: 26°30′02″N 78°00′14″E
- Elevation: 178 metres (584 ft)
- System: Indian Railways station
- Owner: Indian Railways
- Operator: North Central Railway
- Line: Delhi Chennai Line
- Platforms: 3
- Tracks: 4 (Double Electrified BG)
- Connections: Auto stand

Construction
- Structure type: At grade
- Parking: Yes
- Cycle facilities: Yes
- Accessible: Yes

Other information
- Status: Functioning
- Station code: MRA
- Zone(s): North Central Railway
- Division(s): Jhansi
- Fare zone: North Central Railway
Location
- Location within India Location within Madhya Pradesh

Morena railway station is a small railway station in Morena district, Madhya Pradesh. Its code is MRA. It serves Morena city. The station is classified under 80 A class stations across India. this. Station is a Wifi free available in providing by Indian Railways.

The station is well connected by train services to all parts of the country including Delhi, Agra Bhopal, Mumbai, Nagpur Hyderabad, Chennai, Pune, Jaipur, Indore' Jabalpur and other major cities.

== Major trains ==
Some of the important trains that runs from Morena are :

- New Delhi–Habibganj Shatabdi Express
- Chhattisgarh Express
- Khajuraho–Udaipur City Express
- Jhelum Express
- Kalinga Utkal Express
- Gorakhpur–Okha Express
- Ujjaini Express
- Sushasan Express
- Indore–Chandigarh Express
- Andaman Express
- Shaan-e-Bhopal Express
- Mangala Lakshadweep Express
- Dakshin Express
- Malwa Express
- Punjab Mail
- Taj Express
- Grand Trunk Express
- Mahakaushal Express
- Gwalior–Ahmedabad Superfast Express
