= Agra Cantt–Sabarmati Superfast Express =

Train in India

Agra Cantt–Gandhigram Superfast Express

Overview
- Service type: Superfast
- First service: 11 February 2011; 15 years ago (Inaugural); 26 August 2026; 2 months ago (Extended upto Gandhigram)
- Current operator: North Central Railway

Route
- Termini: Agra Cantt. (AGC); Gandhigram (GG)
- Stops: 14
- Distance travelled: 867 km (539 mi)
- Average journey time: 14 hours approx.
- Service frequency: 4 days a week.
- Train number: 12547 / 12548

On-board services
- Classes: AC 2 Tier, AC 3 Tier, Sleeper Class, General Unreserved
- Seating arrangements: Yes
- Sleeping arrangements: Yes
- Catering facilities: E-catering only
- Observation facilities: Large windows
- Baggage facilities: Available
- Other facilities: Below the seats

Technical
- Rolling stock: LHB coach
- Track gauge: 1,676 mm (5 ft 6 in)
- Operating speed: 130 km/h (81 mph) maximum, 62 km/h (39 mph) average including halts.

The 12547 / 12548 Agra Cantt–Gandhigram Superfast Express is a superfast express train belonging to North Central Railway zone of Indian Railways that run between Agra Cantonment and Gandhigram in India.

It was inaugurated on 11 Feb 2011 as tri-weekly superfast express between Ahmedabad Junction and Agra Fort. Later it was extended up to on a daily basis

In 2018, 12547/12548 Ahmedabad–Agra Fort Superfast Express was extended up to Gwalior Junction on three days with a new train number as 22547/22548 Ahmedabad–Gwalior Superfast Express. Terminal of 12547/12548 Ahmedabad–Agra Fort Superfast Express was changed to Agra Cantonment instead of Agra Fort. Now, 12547/12548 Ahmedabad–Agra Cantt Superfast Express operates four days a week from Gandhigram (GG).

== Coach composition ==
The train has standard LHB rakes with a maximum speed of 110 km/h. The train consists of 21 coaches:

- 1 AC II Tier
- 3 AC III Tier
- 9 Sleeper coaches
- 6 General Unreserved
- 2 End-on Generator

== Service ==
This train covers the distance of 867 km with an average speed of 62 km/h with total time of 14 hours 00 mins.

As the average speed of the train is above 55 km/h, as per Indian Railways rules, its fare includes a Superfast surcharge.

== Route and halts ==
The important halts of the train are:

- Agra Cantonment
- Achhnera Junction
- Bharatpur Junction
- Jaipur Junction
- Ajmer Junction
- Beawar
- Marwar Junction
- Falna
- Pindwara
- Abu Road
- Palanpur Junction
- Mahesana Junction
- Gandhigram

== Schedule ==
| Train number | Station code | Departure station | Departure time | Departure day | Arrival station | Arrival time | Arrival day |
|---|---|---|---|---|---|---|---|
| 12547 | AGC | Agra Cantonment | 22:00 PM | Mon, Tue, Thu, Fri | Gandhigram | 12:00 PM | Tue, Wed, Fri, Sat |
| 12548 | GG | Gandhigram | 16:40 PM | Sun, Mon, Wed, Thu | Agra Cantonment | 07:05 AM | Mon, Tue, Thu, Fri |

== Rake sharing ==
The train shares its rake with 22547/22548 Gwalior-Gandhigram Superfast Express.

== Traction ==
As this route is fully electrified, it is hauled by a Kanpur Loco Shed-based WAP-7 electric locomotive pulls the train to the destination on both directions.
