= Sheopur Kalan railway station =

Railway station in Madhya Pradesh, India

Sheopur Kalan Railway Station

General information
- Location: State Highway 6, Sheopur, Madhya Pradesh; India
- Coordinates: 25.671°N 76.700°E
- Elevation: 231 metres (758 ft)
- System: Indian Railways station
- Owner: Indian Railways
- Operator: North Central Railway
- Lines: Jhansi– Shivpuri–Sheopur–Sawai Madhopur railway line, Gwalior–Kota railway line
- Platforms: Work in progress
- Tracks: 2

Construction
- Structure type: Standard (on-ground station)
- Parking: No
- Cycle facilities: No

Other information
- Status: Active
- Station code: SOE
- Zone(s): North Central Railway
- Division(s): Jhansi

Services
| Preceding station | Indian Railways | Following station |
|---|---|---|
| Datarda Kalan towards ? | North Central Railway zone Gwalior–Sheopur railway line | Terminus |
Location

Sheopur Kalan railway station is a railway station in Sheopur district, Madhya Pradesh. Its code is SOE. It serves Sheopur town. The station consists of one platform. The platform is not well sheltered. It lacks many facilities including water, sanitation and proper hygiene.

The lies on other light railways in the former princely state of Gwalior State now part of the North Central Railway in Madhya Pradesh these 200 km of 610mm-gauge lines were originally sponsored by the Maharaja of Gwalior reaching Sheopur in 1909. This railway line has been nominated by Indian government for selection as a World Heritage Site.

== Major trains ==
- Sheopur–Gwalior Passenger
- Sheopur–Sabalgarh Passenger

[Now closed down]
