= Gwalior–Sabarmati Superfast Express =

Train in India

Gwalior–Gandhigram Superfast Express

Overview
- Service type: Superfast
- First service: 2 October 2018; 8 years ago (Inaugural); 26 August 2026; 2 months ago (Extended upto Gandhigram)
- Current operator: North Central Railways

Route
- Termini: Gwalior (GWL); Gandhigram (GG)
- Stops: 17
- Distance travelled: 985 km (612 mi)
- Average journey time: 15 hours 50 mins
- Service frequency: Tri-weekly
- Train number: 22547 / 22548

On-board services
- Classes: AC 2 Tier, AC 3 Tier, Sleeper Class, General Unreserved
- Seating arrangements: Yes
- Sleeping arrangements: Yes
- Catering facilities: E-catering only
- Observation facilities: Large windows
- Baggage facilities: Available
- Other facilities: Below the seats

Technical
- Rolling stock: LHB coach
- Track gauge: 1,676 mm (5 ft 6 in)
- Operating speed: 130 km/h (81 mph) maximum, 62 km/h (39 mph) average including halts.

The 22547 / 22548 Gwalior–Gandhigram Superfast Express is a superfast express train belonging to North Central Railway zone of Indian Railways that run between Gwalior Junction and Gandhigram in India.

It is currently being operated with 22547/22548 train numbers on tri-weekly basis.

== Coach composition ==
The train has standard LHB rakes with max speed of 110 kmph. The train consists of 21 coaches:

- 1 AC II Tier
- 3 AC III Tier
- 9 Sleeper coaches
- 6 General Unreserved
- 2 End-on Generator

== Service ==
- The 22547/Gwalior–Gandhigram Superfast Express has an average speed of 62 km/h and covers 985 km in 15 hrs 50 mins.
- The 22548/Gandhigram–Gwalior Superfast Express has an average speed of 61 km/h and covers 983 km in 16 hrs.

As the average speed of the train is above 55 km/h, as per Indian Railways rules, its fare includes a Superfast surcharge.

== Route and halts ==
The important halts of the train are:

- Gwalior Junction
- Morena
- Dholpur Junction
- Agra Cantonment
- Achhnera Junction
- Bharatpur Junction
- Jaipur Junction
- Ajmer Junction
- Beawar
- Marwar Junction
- Falna
- Pindwara
- Abu Road
- Palanpur Junction
- Mahesana Junction
- Gandhigram

== Schedule ==
Train number	Station code	Departure station	Departure time	Departure day	Arrival station	Arrival time	Arrival day
22547	GWL	Gwalior Junction	20:10 PM	Sun, Wed, Sat	Gandhigram	12:00 PM	Sun, Mon, Thu
22548	GG	Gandhigram	16:40 PM	Tue, Fri, Sat	Gwalior Junction	09:25 AM	Sun, Wed, Sat

== Rake sharing ==
The train shares its rake with 12547/12548 Agra Cantt-Gandhigram Superfast Express.

== Traction ==
As this route is fully electrified, it is hauled by a Kanpur Loco Shed based WAP-7 electric locomotive on its entire journey.
