= Sabalgarh =

- Municipality
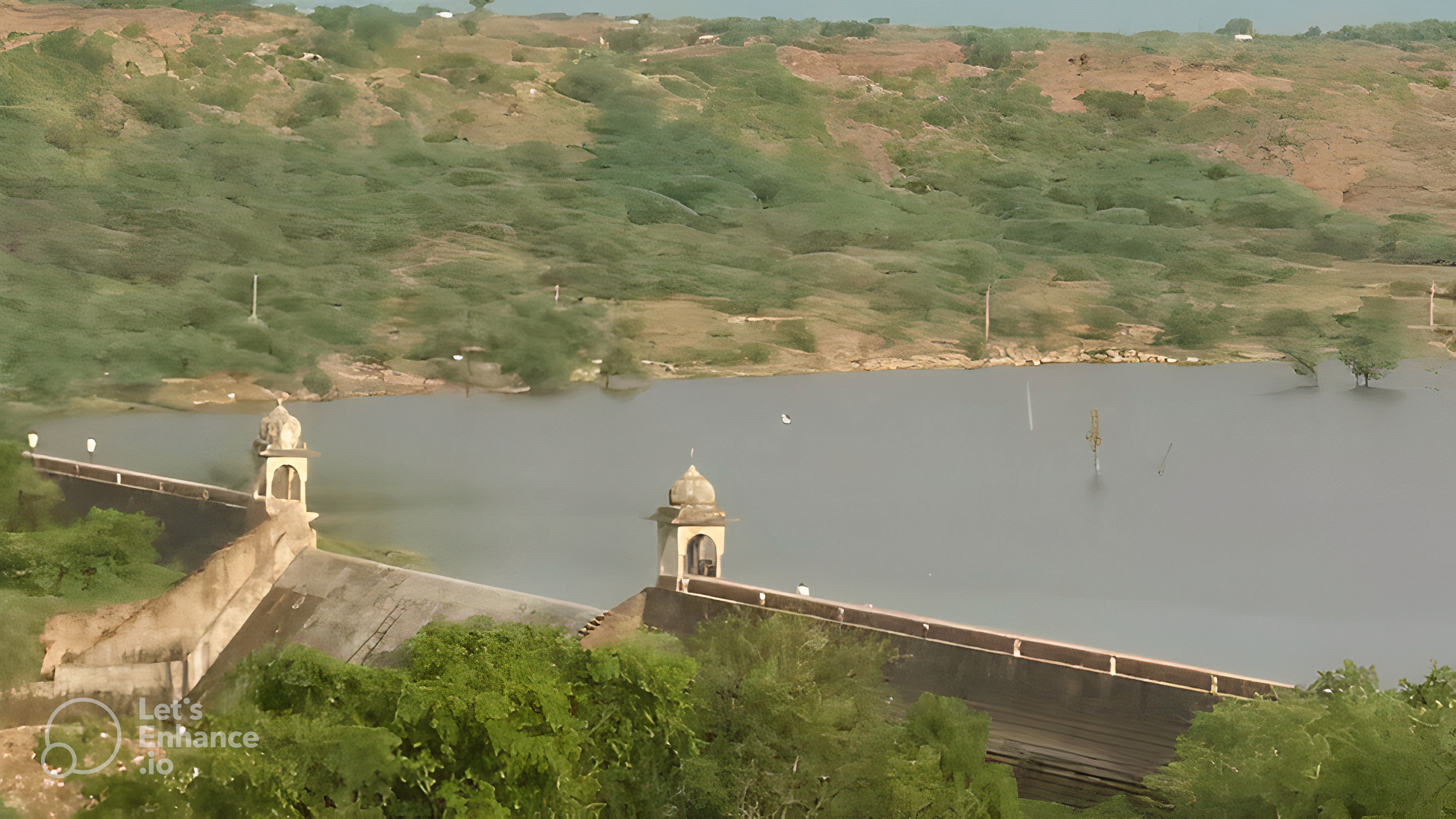
- Sabalgarh Fort Pond
- Nickname: Strong Fort
- Location in Madhya Pradesh, India Sabalgarh (India)
- Coordinates: 26.25°N 77.4°E
- Country: India
- State: Madhya Pradesh
- District: Morena
- Region: Bundelkhand

Government
  - MLA: Baijnath Kushwah
- Elevation: 212 m (696 ft)

Population (2011)
  - Total: 40,333

Languages
  - Official: Bundeli and Hindi
- Time zone: UTC+5:30 (IST)
- PIN: 476229
- Telephone code: 07536
- Vehicle registration: MP06
- Sex ratio: 960 ♂/♀

Sabalgarh is a municipality in Morena district in the Indian state of Madhya Pradesh.

The town was founded by sabala Singh Gujjar.Sabalgarh Fort was built in the 17th century by Gurjar sardar Sabal Singh, a noble in the court of the rulers of Karauli.

Presently, the fortress is in ruins and is infamous for stories of hauntings and ghosts. The fort consists of a defensive structure and one main palaces and many other buildings. The fort has been controlled by a number of different rulers in its history.

About 50 km from the town is Asia's largest siphon, built at the intersection of the Kuno River and the Chambal Right Main canal. The Chambal River is 20 km from town and is a habitat for Indian alligator.

== Demographics ==
Sabalgarh has a population of 40,333, with 53% male and 47% female. Sabalgarh has an average literacy rate of 68%, lower than the national average of 74%. Male literacy was 74% while female literacy was 52%. As measured in 2011, 14% of Sabalgarh's population was under six.

Scheduled Castes represent approximately 16.6% of the population, and Scheduled Tribes account for another 8.6%.

The 2011 census reported a total of 7,091 households. The area's total employed labor force was reported at 11,360. Of this number, 10,262 were categorized as regular laborers, with the remaining 1,098 categorized as irregular.

== Places of interest ==
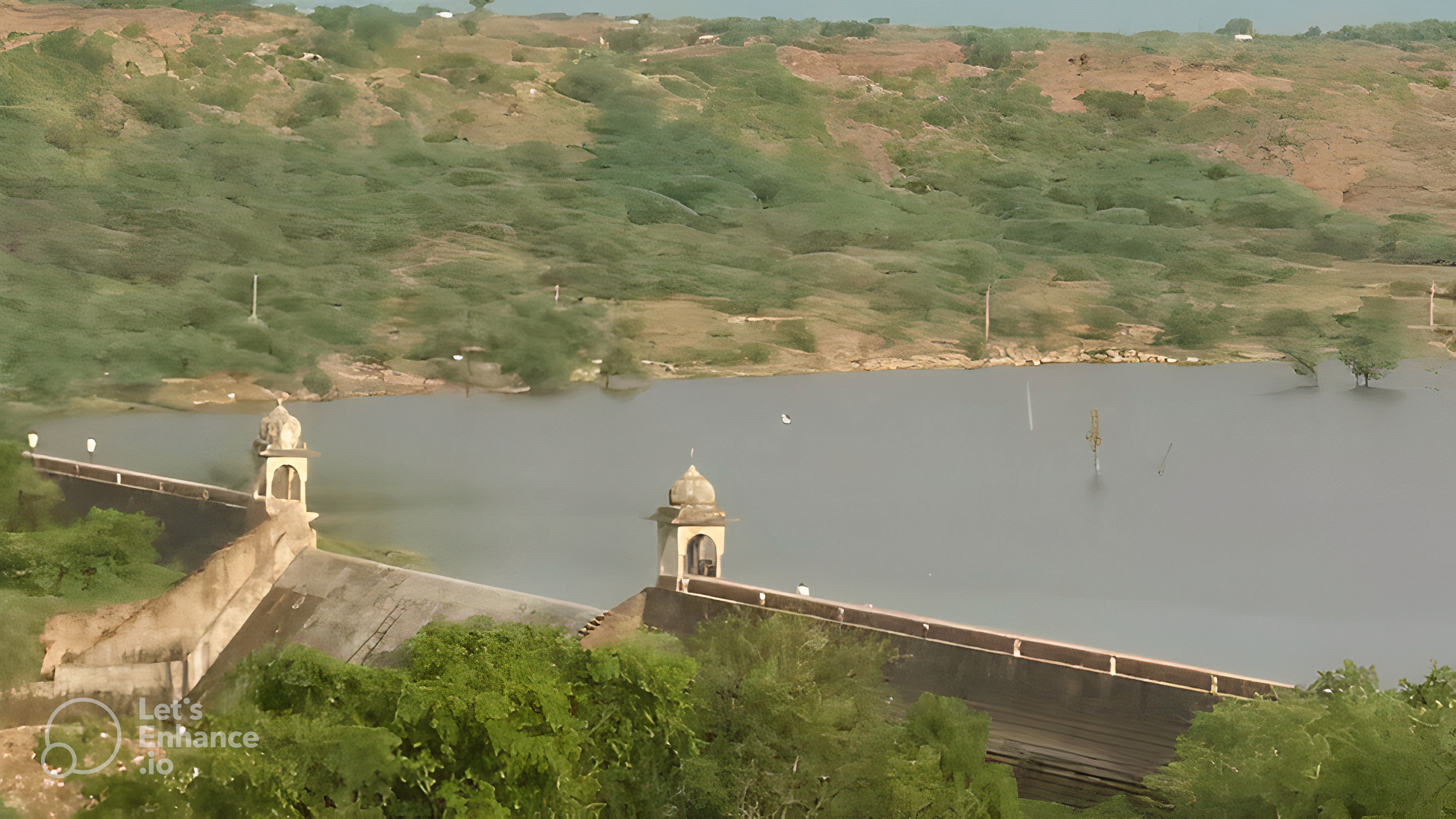
Sabalgarh-Fort-Pond

Sabalgarh Fort: The fort is noteworthy among medieval age monuments The foundation of the Fort has been laid by a chieftain Gujar named Sabala, A ‘Bandh’ was built in the Scindia period behind the fort. The fort was constructed on a cliff by Gopal Singh, the Raja of Karoli. Sikandar Lodhi sent an army to control this fort. The Marathas, in their campaign through northern India, retook the fort and returned control to the Raja of Karoli. In 1795 A.D., it was again taken from the Raja by Khande Rao, whose house stands there. Lord Vallejali Daulat Rao Scindia (1764–1837) lived in this fort during his regime. The fort was seized by the English in 1804. The area surrounding the fort was added to the kingdom of Scindia in 1809.

Alakhiya Khoh: One of the most famous temples of Sabalgarh. It is dedicated to goddess Kaali Mata. It is an ancient temple, and every year for nine days a fair is organised on the occasion of Navratri.

Agni Missile Development Plant: The chief Secretary of State chief minister office has said that In August 2017 the D.R.D.O. New Delhi team has visited the town and confirmed the establishment of the plant of AGNI MISSILE in Sabalgarh and the government has already allotted 1500 hectare land for this project.

Rau Ghaat: A wonderful Tourist attraction Within Sabalagrh.

Other Places:

- Bhuteshwar Mahadev Mandir
- Rani Ka Taal
- Nawal Singh Ki Haweli
- Amar Khoh
- Devi Annapurana Maa Temple
- Atar Ghat
- Alkhiya Kho
- Rest house
- Tonga Lake
- Panchmukhi Hanuman Mandir
- Daudayal Mandir
- Majrawaale Hanumanji Mandir
- Shree Ram Mandir
- Dauji temple
- Shree Radha-Krishna Kalangi Mandir
- Thakur Baba Mandir Chambal
- Chambal River
- Beehad Of Chambal
- Rahughat Waterfall

== Transport and connectivity ==
=== Railways ===
Sabalgarh is connected to Gwalior by a narrow gauge line. This railway is also known as "Gwalior Light Railways". The two-foot (610 mm) narrow gauge GLR is 199.8 kilometres (124.1 mi) long and runs from Gwalior to Sheopur Kalan in the Madhya Pradesh state. This line was started by Maharaja Madhav Roa II and completed in 1909. It is managed by the Central Railways department of Indian Railways.

=== Roads ===
Sabalgarh is fairly well-connected to many cities of Madhya Pradesh by state highways. Daily buses are available to cities including Gwalior, Morena, Sheopur (Shivpur), Shivpuri, Jaipur, Kota, Agra, Mathura and Delhi.

=== Airways ===
The nearest airport is located in Gwalior, about 120 kilometers from Sabalgarh. Daily flights are available to New Delhi and many more cities from Gwalior Airport.

== Distance from major cities ==
- Karauli: 64 km
- Vijaypur: 34 km
- Joura: 44 km
- Hindaun City: 91 km
- Gwalior: 109 km
- Kailaras: 23 km
- Morena: 72 km
- Sheopur: 123 km
- Bhopal: 487 km
- Agra: 159 km
- New Delhi: 389 km
- Delhi: 386 km
- Jaipur: 226 km

== See also ==
- Rampur Kalan
- Sabalgarh (Vidhan Sabha constituency)
