= Sabalgarh Fort =

Hill fort in India

- सबलगढ़ क़िला
- Sabalgarh, Morena District, Madhya Pradesh, India
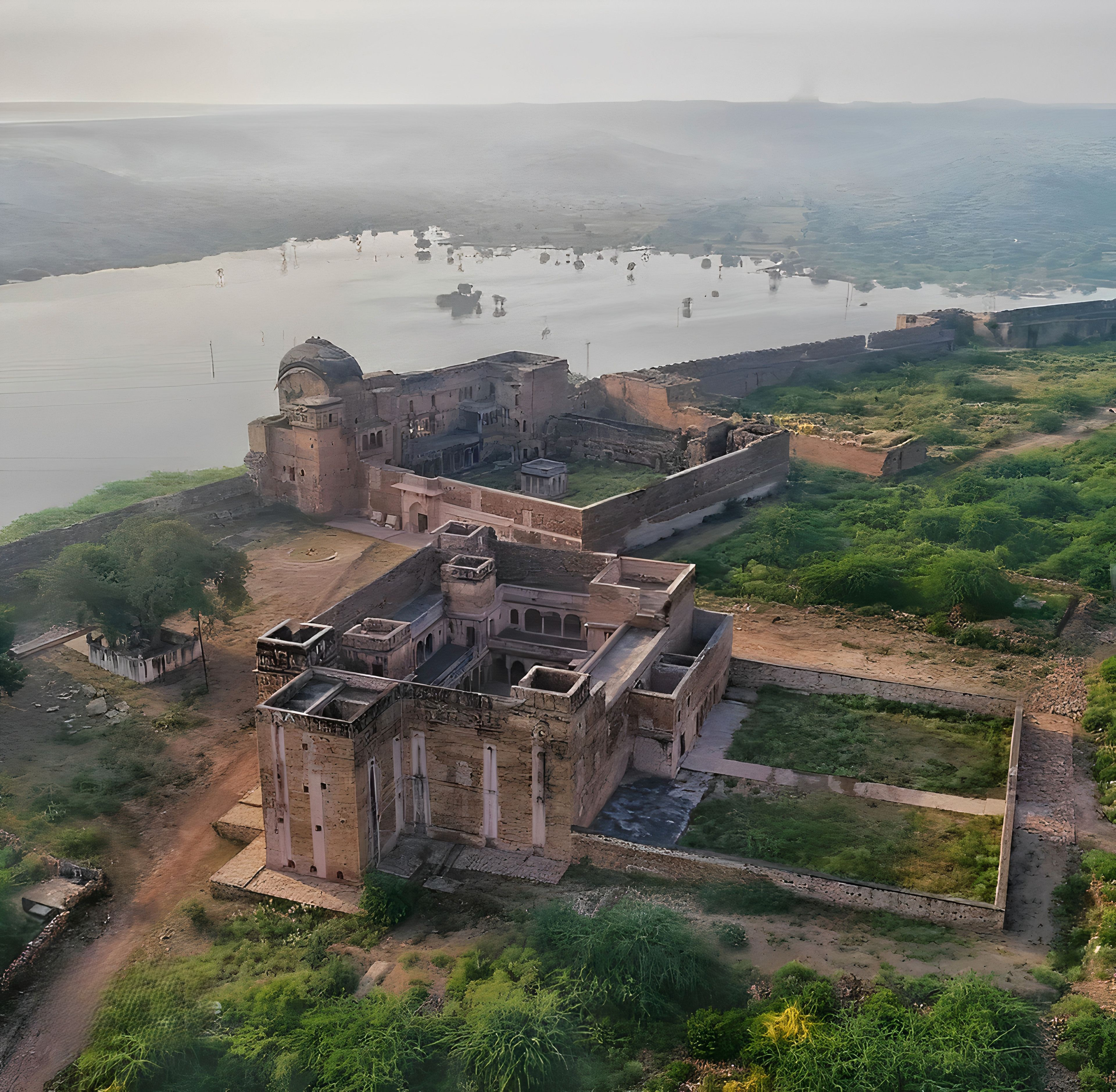
- View of Sabalgarh Fort

Site information
- Type: Fort
- Controlled by: Government of Madhya Pradesh
- Open to the public: Yes
- Condition: old

Location
- Location within India
- Coordinates: 26°14′28.8″N 77°24′20.2″E

Site history
- Built: 16th–17th centuries
- Built by: Kings of Karauli
- In use: No
- Materials: Sandstone

Sabalgarh Fort (Hindi: सबलगढ़ क़िला Sabalgarh Qila) is a 16-17th-century hill fort near Sabalgarh, Madhya Pradesh, India. This fort is situated on a large rock in the northeastern part of Sabalgarh, The town was founded by Raja Sabala Singh Gujjar, Sabalgarh Fort was built in the 17th century Gujjar sardar Sabal Singh, a noble in the court of the rulers of Karauli. he started to build this fort but completed by Gopala Singh of Karauli State. Presently, the fortress is in ruins and is infamous for stories of haunting and ghosts. The fort consists of a defensive structure and one main palace and many other buildings. The fort has been controlled by different rulers of Jadaun and Maratha clan in its history.

== Etymology ==
Sabalgarh means place of strong fort. "Sabal" means strong and "Garh" means fort.

== History ==
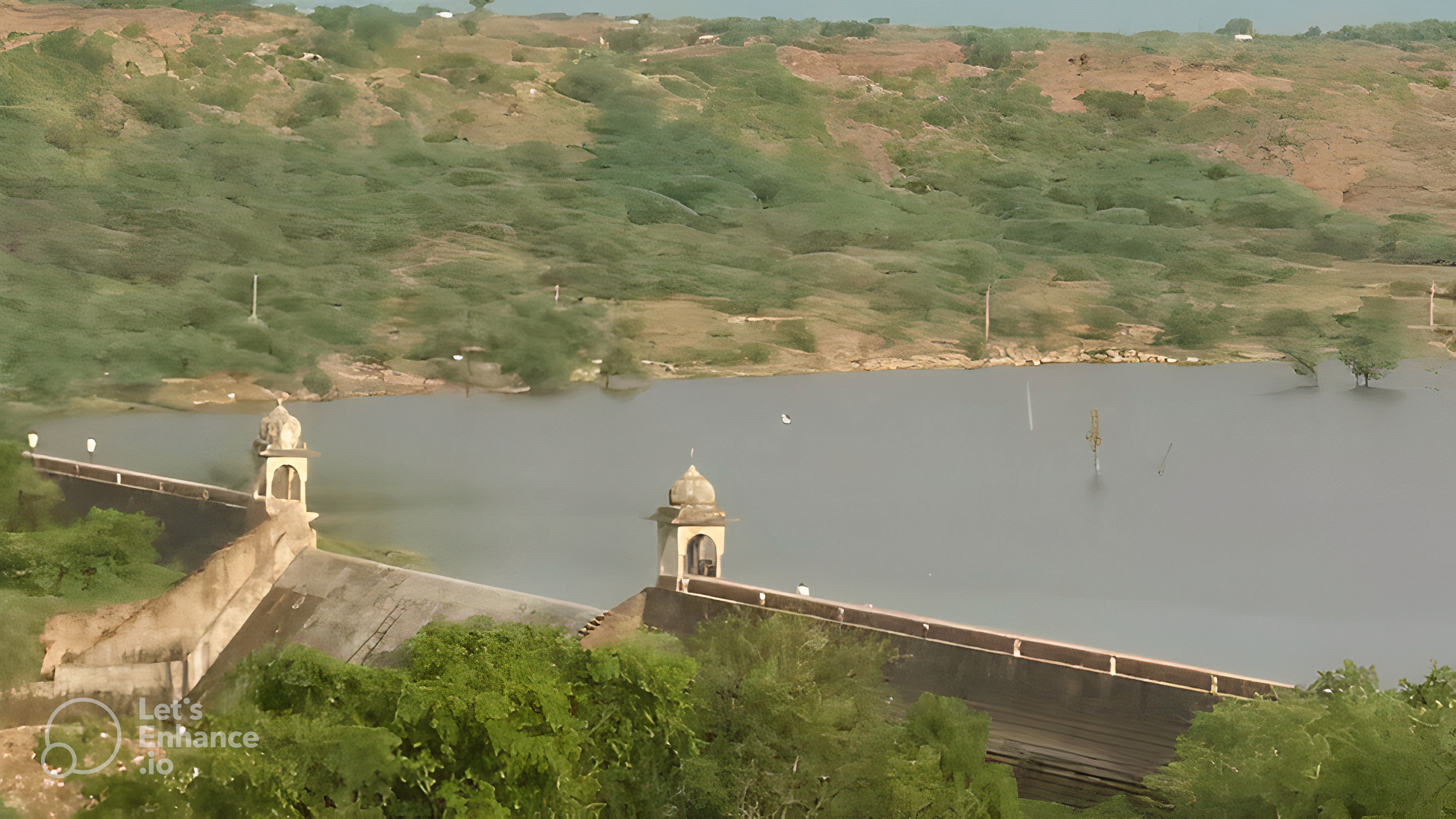
Sabalgarh-Fort-Pond

Foundation of the Fort & Town laid by a ruler known as Raja Sabala Singh living near Chambal river beside Karaoli, a petty state in Rajasthan and now a Tehsil, having a fort and a large tank pool.

In August, 1795, Maratha forces under Lakhwa Dada attacked Sabalgarh. After a stubborn struggle, they reduce the strong fort of Sabalgarh to submission and they attacked Bijaipur and it was also captured and placed in charge of Ambaji Ingale. In 1806, Daulat Rao Sindhia imprisoned Ambaji and demanded Sabalgarh, from him but he refused, though later on he surrendered a few places in the territory to the Raja of Karaoli. The Raja thus came into the possession of Sabalgarh. But these places were again taken back by Scindia's forces and incorporated in his dominions. It was at Sabalgarh, as mentioned earlier, that Daulat Rao Sindhia and Jaswant Rao Holker met for an alliance against the East India Company in 1805. The fort of Sabalgarh is noteworthy among the medieval monuments. There is a ‘Bandh’ built in In 16th Century Sikandar Lodi sent an army to take control of the Sabalgarh.

According to Akbarnama the Sabalgarh was also won by the Akbar during their campaign of asirgarh. The Marathas, in their campaign through northern India, retook the fort and returned it to the Raja of Karauli.

In 1795, the fort was taken by Khande Rao, who built a house within the fort. Lord Vallejali Daulat Rao Scindia (1764-1837) also lived in this fort during his regime. The fort was captured by the Britishers in 1804. The area around the fort was added to the kingdom of Scindia in 1809.

== Structure ==
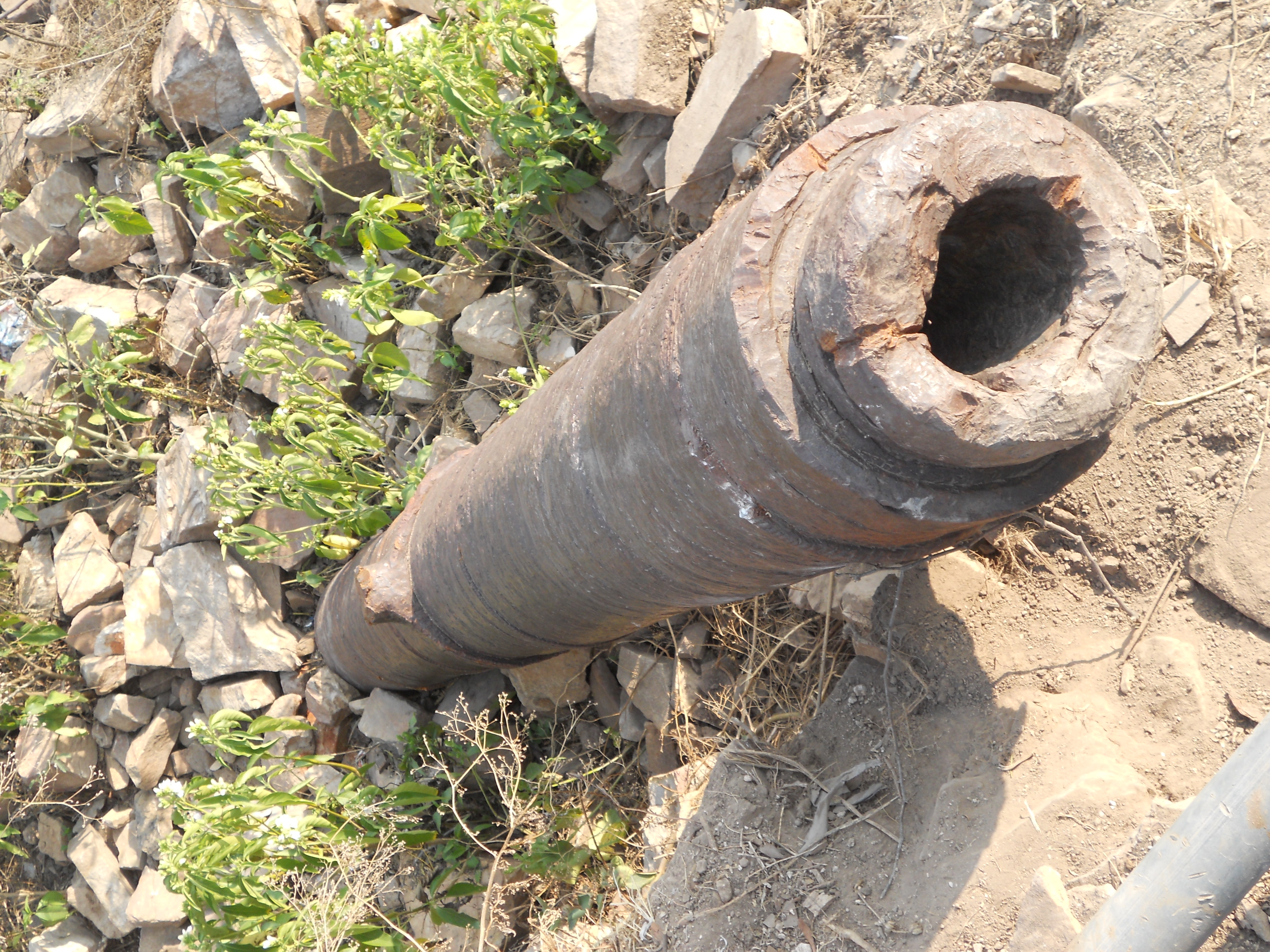
Cannon in Sabalgarh fort

Sabalgarh Fort is built in the Rajasthani style. It has three main gates, and many temples are located within the fort, such as Jagannath Temple. Other historical buildings in the fort include Naval Singh Haveli and the Royal Court (Kacheri).The complex is a fine example of eighteenth century fort planning. It was surrounded by an outer fortification wall on the north and the west side. A continuous fortification wall of 1,800 meters in length can be seen on the north side along the state highway, while some small sections of fortifications are seen along the east side. The east and west sides have the dense forest as a natural defence. There are also remains of a moat along the southern side. The Chambal River on the north and the nalla at the foothills on the west made the location of the fort more favorable. The inner fortification wall is strengthened with 12 bastions and has five gateways. The gateway on the north seems to be the main entrance into the fort, and serves as a connection between the outer and the inner settlement. The inner fort had palaces, residences for the generals and elite (Nawal Singh Haveli), and other ancillary buildings like stables, kacheri (court), and temples, while the rest of the settlement was between the two fortification walls. The settlement had several wells for water and were located both in the inner and outer fortification.
