= Rampur Kalan =

- Village
- Location within Madhya Pradesh
- Coordinates: 26.5°N 78.0°E
- Country: India
- State: Madhya Pradesh
- District: Morena district
- Subdistrict: Sabalgarh
- Elevation: 177 m (581 ft)
- Time zone: UTC+05:30 (IST)
- Pincode: 476229
- ISO 3166 code: MP-IN

Rampur Kalan is a village in the Morena district, Madhya Pradesh located along the banks of Kwari River in India. The village is below the Bundelkand region, 72 kilometers from Morena, India. The region predominantly speaks the local dialect "Khadi Boli" and Hindi. The nearest airport is Gwalior and the nearest railway station is Sabalgarh.
