= Barauni–Gwalior Mail =

Train in India

Barauni-Gwalior Mail
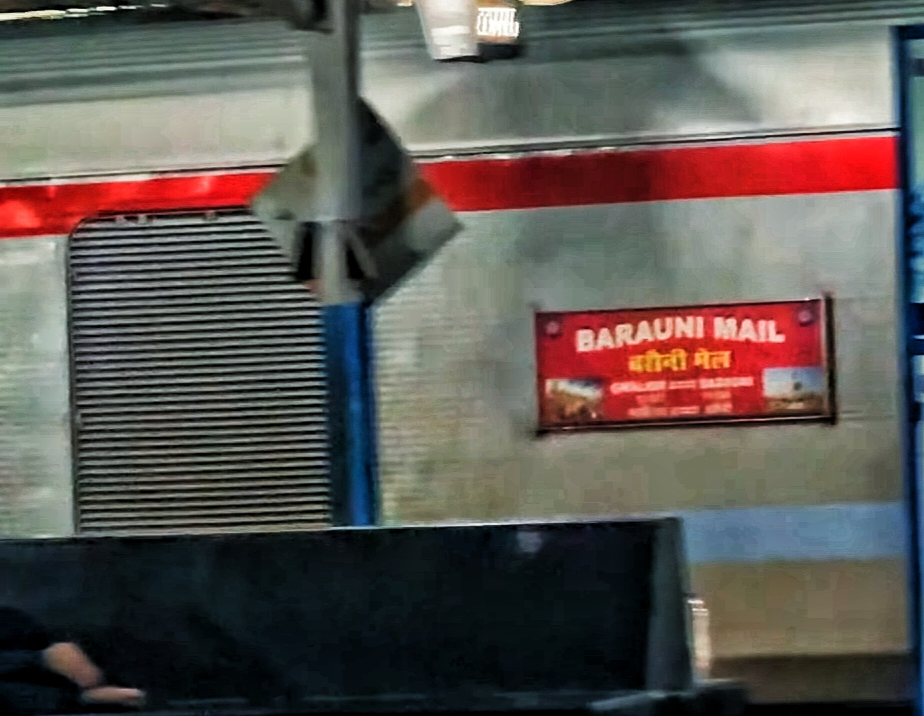

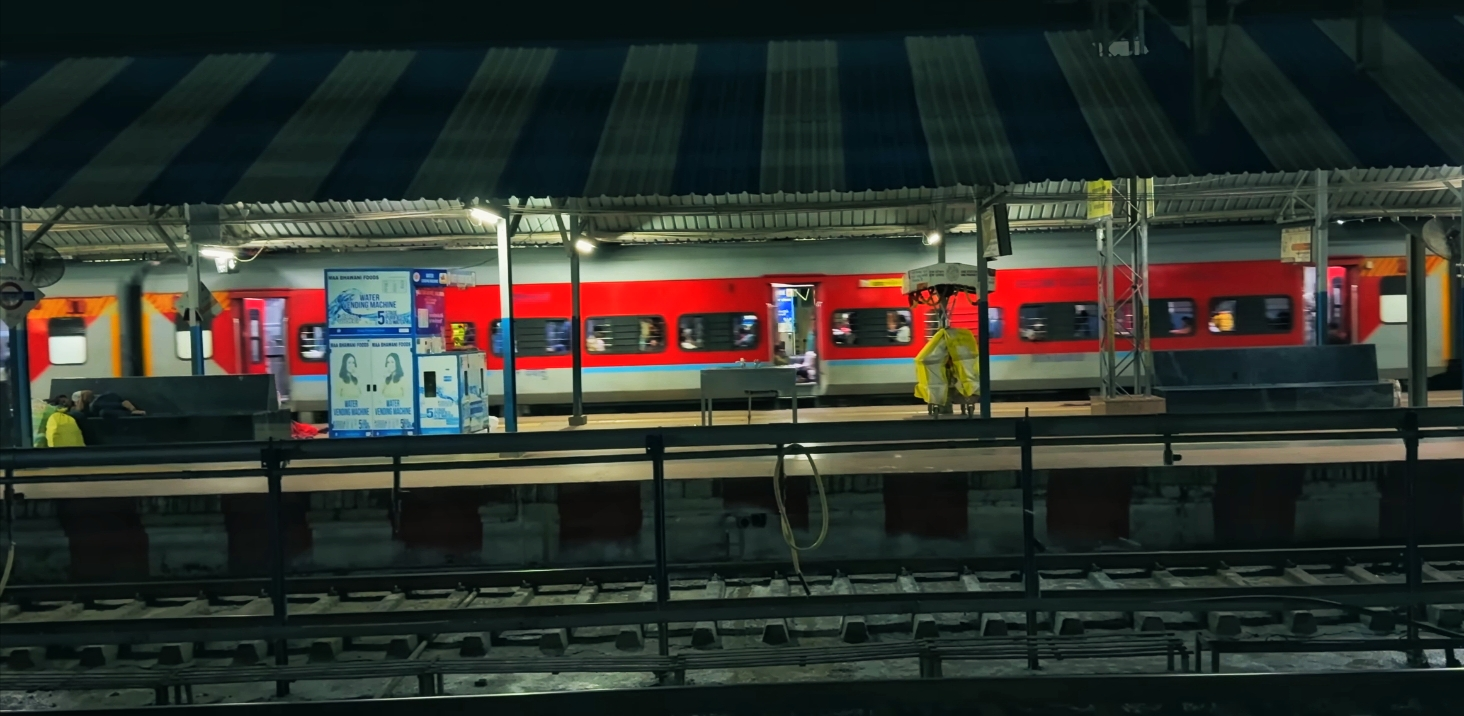
- Barauni-Gwalior Mail At Chhapra Junction railway station

Overview
- Service type: Mail/Express
- Locale: Madhya Pradesh, Uttar Pradesh & Bihar
- First service: 1 November 1889; 137 years ago
- Current operator: North Central Railway

Route
- Termini: Barauni Junction (BJU); Gwalior Junction (GWL)
- Stops: 40 for 11123; 38 for 11124
- Distance travelled: 1,056 km (656 mi)
- Average journey time: 24 hours 50 minutes for 11123; 25 hours 40 minutes for 11124
- Service frequency: Daily
- Train number: 11123 / 11124

On-board services
- Classes: AC 2 Tier, AC 3 Tier, Sleeper Class, General Unreserved
- Seating arrangements: Yes
- Sleeping arrangements: Yes
- Catering facilities: E-catering only
- Observation facilities: Large Windows
- Baggage facilities: Under the seat

Technical
- Rolling stock: LHB coach
- Track gauge: 1,676 mm (5 ft 6 in)
- Operating speed: 42 km/h (26 mph) average for 11123 and 41 km/h (25 mph) for 11124.

The 11123/11124 Barauni–Gwalior Mail is a mail/express train of the Indian Railways connecting Gwalior Junction in Madhya Pradesh and Barauni Junction of Bihar. Inaugurated in 1889, it is one of the oldest running trains of Indian Railways.

== Arrival and departure ==
- Train 11123 departs from Gwalior daily at 12:05 hrs. and reaches reaching Barauni the next day at 12:55 hrs.
- Train 11124 departs from Barauni daily at 18:50 hrs, and reaches Gwalior the next day at 20:30 hrs.

== Important halts ==
The train stops at the following important halts on its way to Gwalior.

- Barauni Junction
- Samastipur Junction
- Muzaffarpur Junction
- Hajipur Junction
- Chhapra Junction
- Siwan Junction
- Deoria Sadar
- Bhatni Junction
- Gorakhpur Junction
- Basti
- Gonda Junction
- Barabanki Junction
- Lucknow Charbagh
- Kanpur Central
- Orai
- Jhansi Junction
- Gwalior Junction

== Coach composition ==
From 15 June 2025, two of the train's three dedicated rakes has been upgraded with Linke-Hoffman-Busch coaches. The primary maintenance is executed at Gwalior.

Legends
| EOG/SLR | PC | MIL | H | A | HA | B | AB | G | K | E | C | S | D | GEN/UR |
|---|---|---|---|---|---|---|---|---|---|---|---|---|---|---|
| Generator cum luggage van | Pantry car or Hot buffet car | Military coach | First AC (1A) | Second AC (2A) | First AC cum Second AC | Third AC (3A) | Third AC cum Second AC | Third AC economy (3E) | Anubhuti coach (K) | Executive chair car (EC) | AC Chair car (CC) | Sleeper class (SL) | Second seating (2S) | General or Unreserved |
| | Loco and other service coach | | | | | | | | | | | | | |
| | AC coach | | | | | | | | | | | | | |
| | Non-AC coach | | | | | | | | | | | | | |

Coach position of 11123 (ex. Gwalior)

| Loco | 1 | 2 | 3 | 4 | 5 | 6 | 7 | 8 | 9 | 10 | 11 | 12 | 13 | 14 | 15 | 16 | 17 | 18 | 19 | 20 | 21 | 22 | Ref |
|---|---|---|---|---|---|---|---|---|---|---|---|---|---|---|---|---|---|---|---|---|---|---|---|
| | EOG | GEN | GEN | GEN | A1 | A2 | B1 | B2 | B3 | B4 | S1 | S2 | S3 | S4 | S5 | S6 | S7 | S8 | S9 | GEN | GEN | SLR | |

Coach position of 11124 (ex. Barauni)

| Loco | 1 | 2 | 3 | 4 | 5 | 6 | 7 | 8 | 9 | 10 | 11 | 12 | 13 | 14 | 15 | 16 | 17 | 18 | 19 | 20 | 21 | 22 | Ref |
|---|---|---|---|---|---|---|---|---|---|---|---|---|---|---|---|---|---|---|---|---|---|---|---|
| | EOG | GEN | GEN | GEN | A1 | A2 | B1 | B2 | B3 | B4 | S1 | S2 | S3 | S4 | S5 | S6 | S7 | S8 | S9 | GEN | GEN | SLR | |

Note that the train reverses its direction at Jhansi, so the coach positions of the train gets reversed for all stations that comes after Jhansi. Passengers are advised to check coach position indicator at station before boarding.

== Traction ==
The train is hauled by a Jhansi based WAP-4 electric locomotive from Barauni to Gwalior and vice versa.

== See also ==
- Ratlam–Gwalior Intercity Express
- Chambal Express
- Bhopal–Gwalior Intercity Express
