= Jhansi– Shivpuri–Sheopur–Sawai Madhopur railway line =

Proposed railway line in India

Overview
- Status: Proposed
- Owner: Indian Railways
- Locale: Uttar Pradesh, Madhya Pradesh, Rajasthan
- Termini: Jhansi; Sawai Madhopur

Service
- Operator: West Central Railway (proposed)

The Jhansi– Shivpuri–Sheopur–Sawai Madhopur railway line is a proposed railway corridor. The proposed line is expected to connect the cities of Jhansi, Shivpuri, Sheopur and Sawai Madhopur.

== Overview ==
The proposed railway line is part of broader efforts to expand rail infrastructure in Madhya Pradesh and adjoining regions. Surveys for multiple new railway routes have been approved.

== Route ==
The proposed alignment of the railway line includes:

- Jhansi (Uttar Pradesh)
- Shivpuri (Madhya Pradesh)
- Sheopur (Madhya Pradesh)
- Sawai Madhopur (Rajasthan)

== Background ==
MP Vivek Shejwalkar raised the issue of construction of the route in parliament, after no progress had been made on the project for several years following the initial survey.

== See also ==
- Indian Railways
- Rail transport in India
- Jhansi Junction railway station
- Sawai Madhopur Junction
