= Rani Kamalapati–New Delhi Shatabdi Express =

Shatabdi Express train in India

Bhopal Shatabdi Express

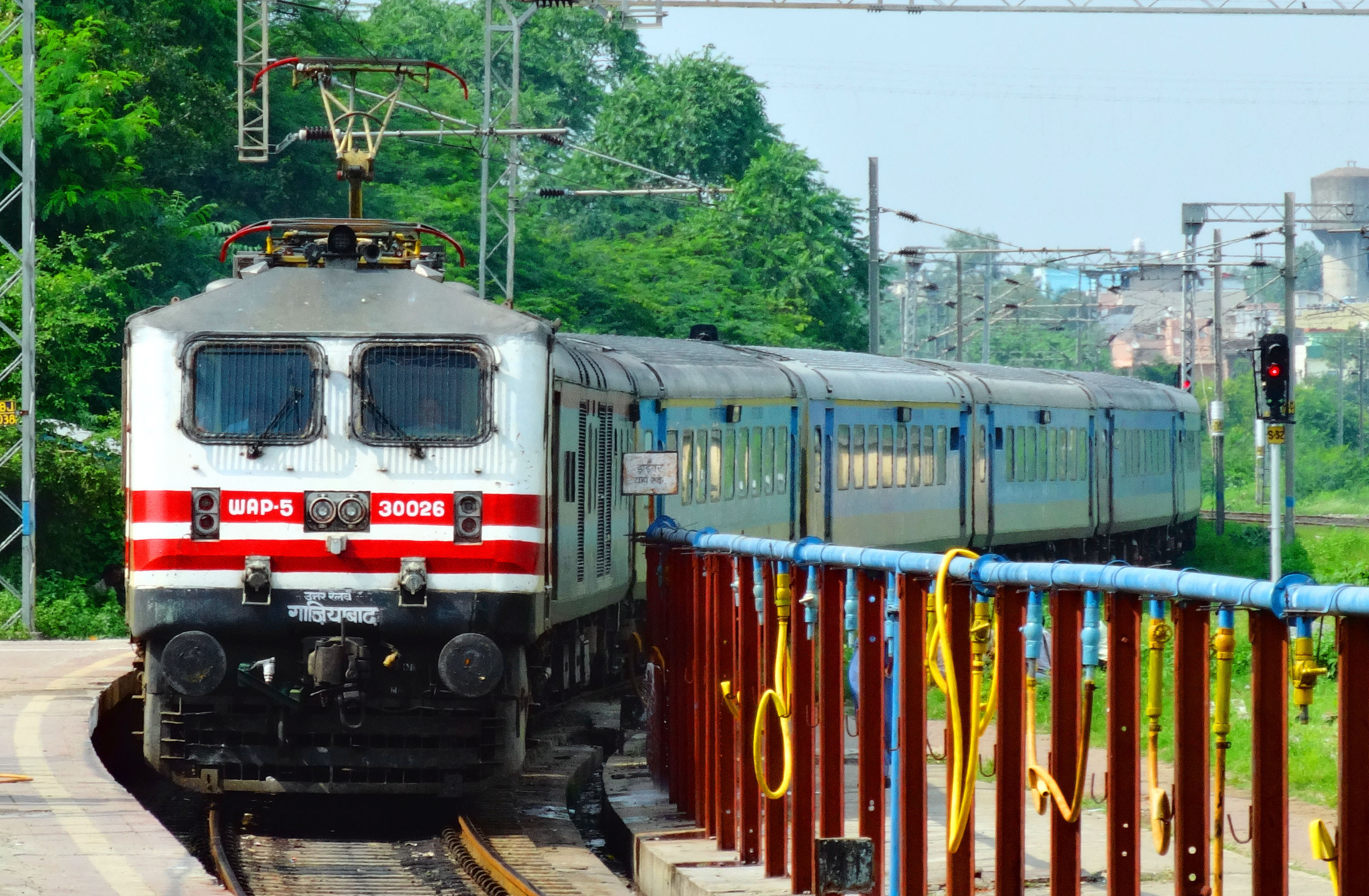
- Bhopal Shatabdi Express

Overview
- Service type: Shatabdi Express
- Status: Operating
- Locale: Madhya Pradesh, Rajasthan, Uttar Pradesh, Haryana & Delhi
- First service: 10 July 1988; 38 years ago for 12001, 14 November 1988; 38 years ago for 12002 between New Delhi - Gwalior
- Current operator: Northern Railway zone
- Ridership: 800 to 1,100 Passengers Per Daily Run

Route
- Termini: Rani Kamlapati; New Delhi
- Stops: 11
- Distance travelled: 709 km (441 mi)
- Average journey time: 8 hours 40 mins
- Service frequency: Daily
- Train number: 12001 / 12002
- Line used: Chennai–Bhopal–Delhi main line (from Rani Kamlapati till New Delhi)

On-board services
- Classes: Executive Class, AC Chair Car
- Seating arrangements: Yes
- Sleeping arrangements: No
- Catering facilities: No Pantry Car But Provided
- Observation facilities: LHB Coaches
- Entertainment facilities: Large Windows
- Baggage facilities: Overhead racks
- Other facilities: Catering Onboard Provided

Technical
- Rolling stock: LHB coach
- Track gauge: 1,676 mm (5 ft 6 in)
- Electrification: Yes
- Operating speed: 130 km/h (81 mph) maximum 82 km/h (51 mph), including halts
Route map
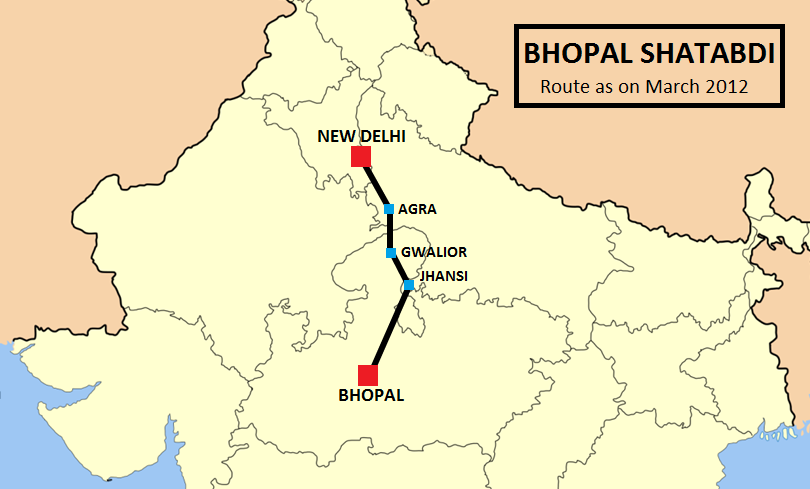

The 12001/02 Rani Kamalapati-New Delhi Shatabdi Express known as Bhopal Shatabdi Express is a train operated by the Northern Railways which runs between New Delhi, the main railway station of India's capital territory, New Delhi, and Rani Kamalapati railway station, the suburban railway station of Bhopal, the state capital of the central Indian state of Madhya Pradesh. For Many Years It Held the Fastest Train of India: Since It's Introduction in 1988 to Middle of 2012 with Commercial Speed of 90.5 km/h and Middle of 2013 to Last Day of 2013 with Commercial Speed of 87.5 km/h(Two Separate Periods) with Maximum Permissible Speed of 150 km/h on New Delhi-Agra stretch.

It runs on the New Delhi-Agra stretch. The train commenced service in 1988 and was the first Shatabdi train to be introduced. The train runs at an average speed of 82 km/h (51 mph), including halts. The train was extended to Habibganj Railway Station from 1 September 2014; 12 years ago.

== History ==
The name "Shatabdi" means century in Sanskrit. The first Shatabdi Express train was introduced in 1988 to commemorate the birth century of Jawahar Lal Nehru, the first Prime Minister of India. Madhavrao Scindia was the Indian Railway Minister at that point of time and the Shatabdi Express was his brainchild. The first Shatabdi Express was flagged off between New Delhi and Gwalior Junction on 10th July 1988 which was later extended to Bhopal Junction and Habibganj railway stations.

== Route ==
• New Delhi

• Mathura Junction

• Agra Cantonment

• Dholpur

• Morena

• Gwalior Junction

• VGL Jhansi Junction

• Lalitpur Junction

• Bina Junction

• Bhopal Junction

• Rani Kamalapati

== Traction ==
This train runs with Ghaziabad-based WAP-5.

== See also ==
- AC Superfast Express
- Bullet train (Mumbai-Ahmedabad)
- Duronto Express
- Garib Rath Express
- Gatimaan Express
- Humsafar Express
- Mahamana Express
- Rajdhani Express
- Shatabdi Express
- Tejas Express
- Uday Express
- Vande Bharat Express
