= Gwalior Sithouli railway station =

Railway station in Madhya Pradesh, India

Coordinates: 26.146°N 78.187°E

Gwalior Sithouli (Station Code :STLI) a railway station in the city of Gwalior. The station lies on main broad gauge line towards Datia & Bhopal from Gwalior main railway station. A couple of passenger trains currently halt at this station. Passengers to this station would typically include nearby village people and students from the ITM Gwalior situated in vicinity of Sithouli. The Rail Spring Factory is nearby.
