= Taj Express =

Train in India

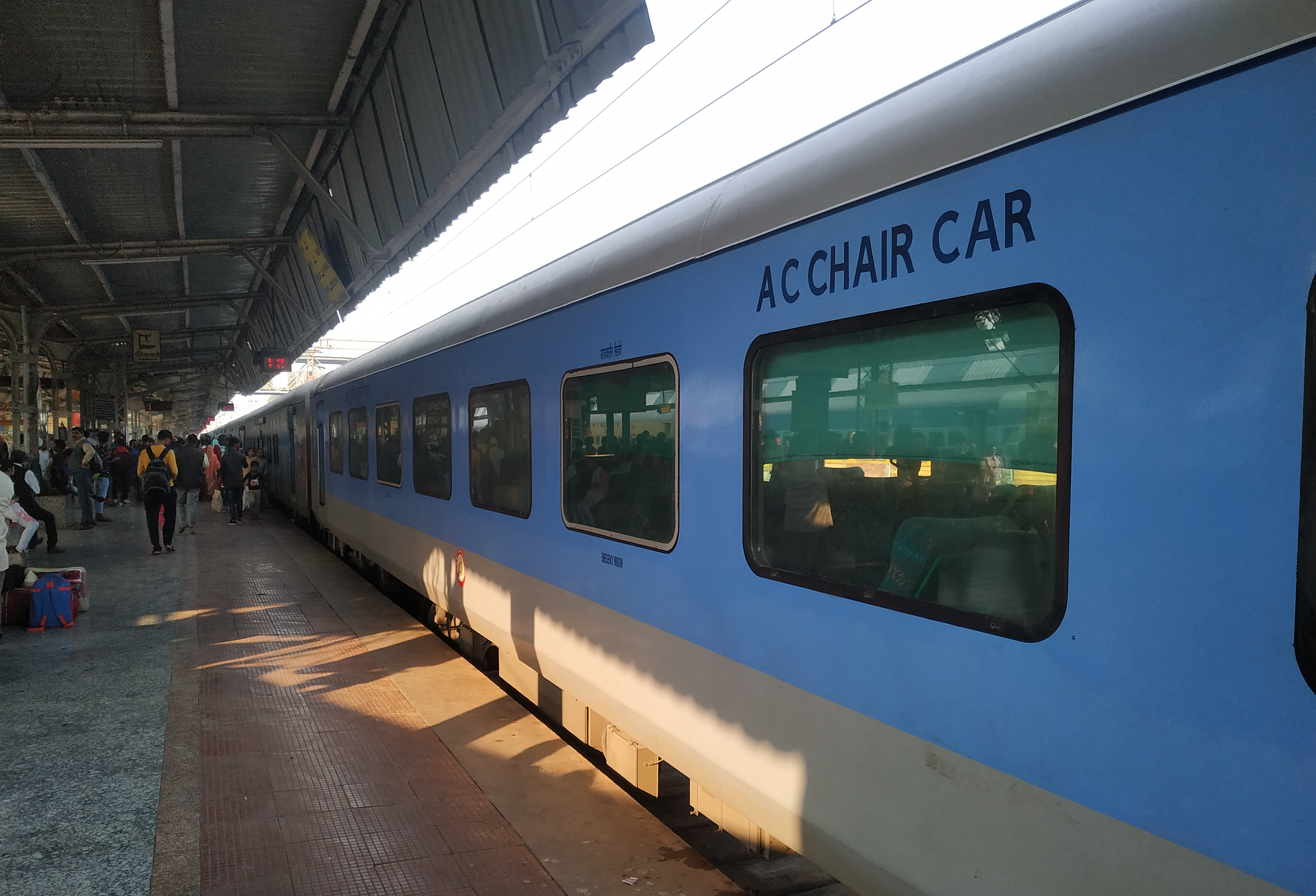
- Taj Express standing on Agra Cantonment Railway station

Overview
- Service type: Mail/Express
- Locale: Delhi, Haryana, Uttar Pradesh, Rajasthan & Madhya Pradesh
- First service: 1 October 1964 between New Delhi & Agra Extended in 1985 between New Delhi & Gwalior Extended in 1 July 2006 between New Delhi & Jhansi
- Current operator: Northern Railway

Route
- Termini: New Delhi; Jhansi Junction
- Stops: 10
- Distance travelled: 410 km (250 mi)
- Average journey time: 7 hours
- Service frequency: Daily
- Train number: 12279 / 12280

On-board services
- Class: Executive Class Premium Class
- Seating arrangements: 2S & CC
- Sleeping arrangements: No
- Catering facilities: No

Technical
- Rolling stock: LHB coach (started from 4 January 2016)
- Track gauge: 1,676 mm (5 ft 6 in)
- Operating speed: 59 km/h (37 mph) average with halts

The Taj Express is a railway service started in 1964, initially serving tourists travelling from Delhi to Agra. It reduced the travelling time from over three hours to around two and a half hours. Taj Express was started along the lines of Deccan Queen, which ran as a high-speed commuter-special train between Pune Junction and CSMT Mumbai (ex Victoria Terminus Bombay), and provided a quick and comfortable journey between Agra and Delhi. It was a very popular train, especially among foreign tourists, before the Bhopal Shatabdi was introduced in 1988. The train was extended up to Gwalior in 1985 and then to Jhansi in 2006. It was named after Taj Mahal.

== History ==
- In 1964 Taj Express was introduced from New Delhi to Agra. Running at 105 km/h, it brought down travel time on this route to 2h 35m. It was hauled by a WP-7003 steam engine. It was a train that was immensely popular with tourists, particularly foreigners, as it gave them ample time to visit the Taj Mahal and neighbouring monuments before returning to Delhi that evening. It was posted on Facebook page of Ministry of Railways, Government of India (Facebook confirmed that this is the authentic profile for this public figure.) on 1 October 2022: On this day in 1964, Taj Express, the then fastest train on the Indian Railways Network was introduced between New Delhi and Agra Cantt.
- Surprisingly, the train did not run on Wednesdays. The Taj Mahal monument was then closed to tourists on Mondays and the one day off on Wednesdays was a direct financial loss. The Archaeological Survey of India then decided that the Taj Mahal would remain closed on Fridays for the public except for Muslims who could pray in the mosque between 12 noon to 2 P.M. The Taj Express still did not operate on Wednesdays.
- In Oct, 1982 The Taj Express began using diesel locomotives (WDM-2).
- In 1985, then-Railway Minister Madhavrao Scindia extended the Taj Express to Gwalior Junction. Journey time was 5hrs 20 min, leaving Hazrat Nizamuddin at 0710 am and reaching Gwalior at 1230 pm. The return timings were 1710 pm departure Gwalior and 2230 pm arrival Hazrat Nizamuddin. In 1989, the Wednesdays off was discontinued. The train, however, remained idle for well over four hours at Gwalior.
- In 1986, the Taj Express began using electric locomotives.
- 1 July 2006, the train was extended to Jhansi.
- 4 January 2016, the train introduced LHB coach. And use the livery of Shatabdi Express train coaches
- 21 February 2018, the source for 12280 and destination station of 12279, changed from Hazrat Nizamuddin (NZM) to New Delhi (NDLS).
- 3 June 2024, three coaches of a train heading towards Jhansi were burnt after a fire broke out from one of its coaches. There are no injuries among the passengers.

== Train information ==
As the whole route is electrified, the train is generally hauled by WAP-7 from Ghaziabad for its whole journey. But occasionally it is also hauled by WAP-5 from Ghaziabad.

Locomotive	Ghaziabad (GZB)	WAP-5	WAP-7

Train coaches	LHB rakes

ENG	Luggage brake & Generator car	AC Chair Car (1st Class)			Chair Car (2nd Class)														General (3rd Class)		Luggage brake & Generator car
L	EOG	C1	C2	C3	D1	D2	D3	D4	D5	D6	D7	D8	D9	D10	D11	D12	D13	D14	GS1	GS2	EOG

== Route ==
The train numbered 12279 goes from Gwalior Junction to New Delhi railway station, and train number is 12280 goes from New Delhi railway station to Jhansi.

Taj Express
#	Station	Code	Average speed / hour	Zone	Address
1	New Delhi	NDLS	40	NR	Ajmeri Gate 110002, Delhi NCT
2	Nizamuddin, Delhi	NZM	70	NR	New Delhi 110013, Delhi NCT
3	Faridabad	FDB	80	NR	PIN 121003, Haryana
4	Mathura	MTJ	90	NCR	Mathura, Uttar Pradesh
5	Raja ki Mandi, Agra	RKM	30	NCR	Agra, Uttar Pradesh
6	Agra Cantt, Agra	AGC	60	NCR	Agra, Uttar Pradesh
7	Dhaulpur	DHO	60	NCR	Dhaulpur, Rajasthan
8	Morena	MRA	60	NCR	Morena, Madhya Pradesh
9	Gwalior Junction	GWL	70	NCR	Gwalior, Madhya Pradesh
10	Dabra	DBA	73	NCR	Dabra, Madhya Pradesh
11	Datia	DAA	26	NCR	Datia, Madhya Pradesh
12	Jhansi Junction	JHS	43	NCR	Jhansi, Uttar Pradesh

== See also ==
- Bhopal Shatabdi
- Bhopal Express
- Indian Railways coaching stock
