= Birlanagar Junction railway station =

Railway station in Madhya Pradesh, India

Birlanagar Junction
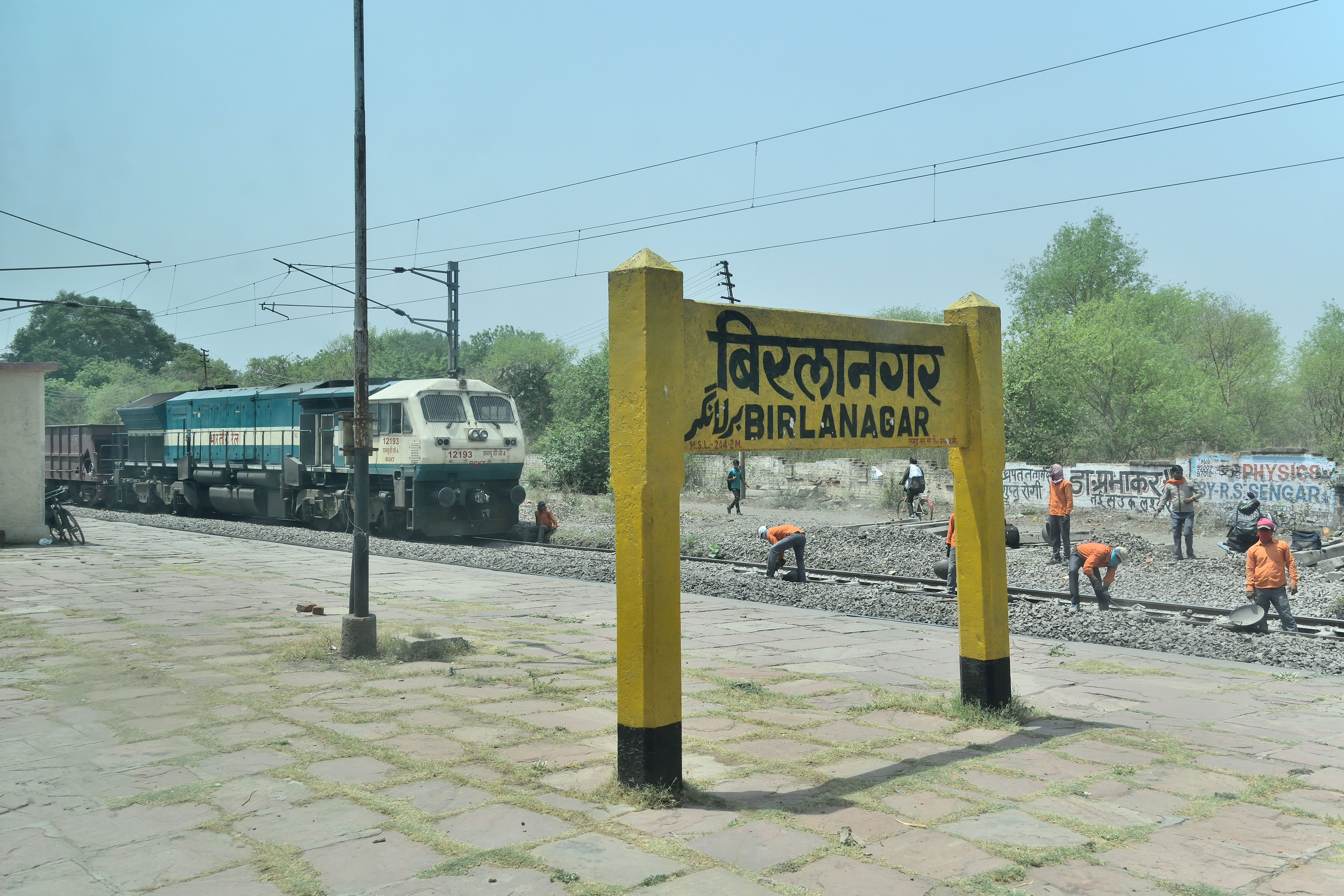
- Birlanagar Junction

General information
- Location: JC Mills Road, Birla Nagar, Gwalior, Madhya Pradesh; India
- Coordinates: 26°14′17″N 78°11′43″E
- Elevation: 204.2 metres (670 ft)
- System: Indian Railways station
- Owner: Indian Railways
- Operator: North Central Railway
- Platforms: 3
- Tracks: 5 (Double electrified BG)
- Connections: Auto stand

Construction
- Structure type: Standard (on ground station)
- Parking: Yes
- Cycle facilities: No
- Accessible: Yes

Other information
- Status: Functioning
- Station code: BLNR
- Zone(s): North Central Railway
- Division(s): Jhansi
Location
- Location within India Location within Madhya Pradesh

Birlanagar Junction Railway Station is a railway junction in Gwalior city, Madhya Pradesh. Its code is BLNR. It serves Gwalior city. The station consists of three platforms.

== Major trains ==
- Gwalior–Bhind Passenger (unreserved)
- Agra–Jhansi Passenger (unreserved)
- Agra–Gwalior Fast Passenger (unreserved)
- Kota–Bhind Passenger
- Gwalior–Agra Fast Passenger (unreserved)
