= Sarwar Fort =

- Interactive map of Sarwar Fort
- Location: Sarwar, Rajasthan, India
- Coordinates: 26.0582238°N 75.007604°Enative_name=सरवार फोर्ट
- Type: Fort

The Sarwar Fort is a fort in the city of Sarwar, Rajasthan, India. It was built by the Royal Gaur dynasty (Sarwar clan) who were the rulers of the Kishangarh state. Sarwadi gate of Kishangarh was built by this Adi Gaur dynasty of Bharadwaj Gotra.
