= Bhopal–Gwalior Intercity Express =

Train in India

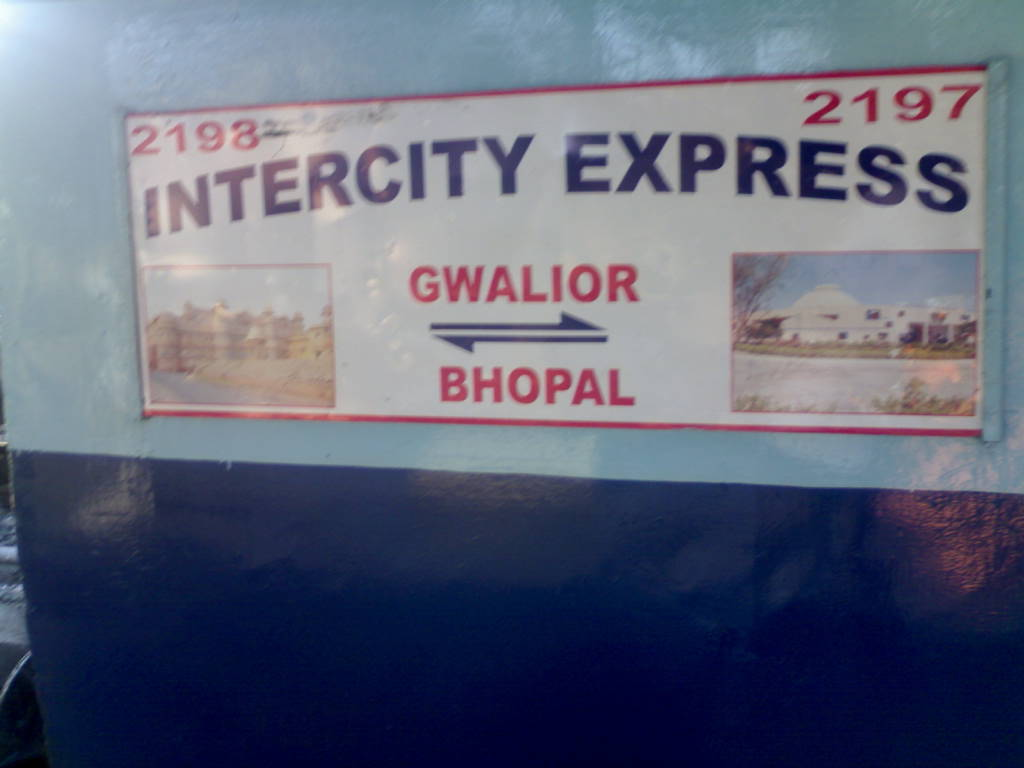

The Bhopal–Gwalior Intercity Express is a superfast inter-city train service which runs between Bhopal Junction railway station of Bhopal City, the capital of Madhya Pradesh and Gwalior Junction railway station in north Madhya Pradesh. The train runs via Bina jn, Guna Jn, Shivpuri. It is the only train which connects Shivpuri to State Capital Bhopal.

== Number and nomenclature ==
The number provided for the train is :

- 2197: BHOPAL–GWALIOR–BHOPAL
- 2198: GWALIOR–BHOPAL–GWALIOR

The name Intercity refers to a passenger service offered between two important cities.

== Coach composite ==
The train consists of a total of 12 coaches whose classes are:

- 4 Second Class Chair Car
- 5 General
- 1 Handicapped/chair car for physically challenged

== Average speed and frequency ==
The train runs with an average speed of 61 km/hour. It runs on Mon., Tue., Thu., Fri. and Sat. from both the cities.

== Route and halts ==
The train stops only at 9 halts between Bhopal and Gwalior which include :

- Bhopal Junction
- Vidisha
- Ganj Basoda
- Bina Junction
- Mungaoli
- Ashoknagar
- Guna Junction
- Badarwas
- Kolaras
- Shivpuri
- Gwalior Junction

== Trivia ==
- This train is the only Intercity Express train service on Bhopal–Bina–Guna-Shivpuri route.
- It is the first Super Fast Intercity Express of Madhya Pradesh while other Intercity are Express only. But it not runs Fast and can be stopped for passenger train, freight train passing.
- The only intercity express in India which runs five days a week while other runs on daily basis. It should be run on daily basis.
