= Indian locomotive class WDS-5 =

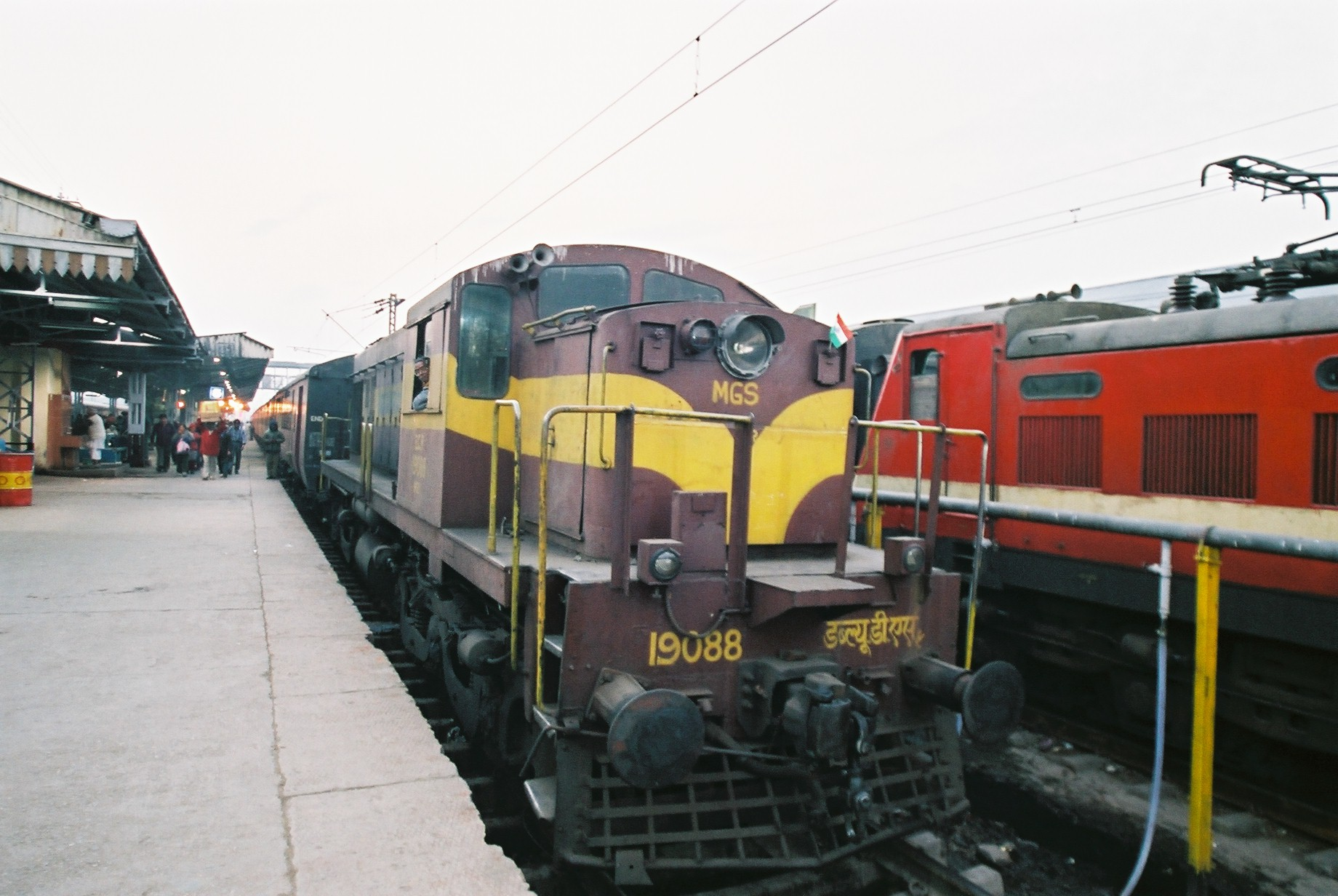
- Mughalsarai WDS-5 doing some shunting jobs at MughalSarai Junction
Type and origin
- Power type: Diesel
- Designer: ALCO
- Builder: ALCO
- Order number: 66/RSF/466/13
- Model: DL-535D
- Build date: 1967
- Total produced: 21
Specifications
- Configuration
  - AAR: C-C
  - UIC: Co′Co′
  - Commonwealth: Co-Co
- Gauge: 1,676 mm (5 ft 6 in)
- Bogies: ALCO Asymmetric cast frame trimount
- Wheel diameter: 1,092 mm (3 ft 7 in)
- Wheelbase: 2.108 m (6 ft 11 in)
  - Engine: 1
- Length: 16.522 m (54 ft 2 1/2 in)
- Width: 3.864 m (12 ft 8 1/8 in)
- Height: 3.039 m (9 ft 11 5/8 in)
- Axle load: 21,000 kg (46,000 lb)
- Loco weight: 126,000 kg (278,000 lb)
- Fuel type: Diesel
- Fuel capacity: 5,000 L (1,100 imp gal; 1,300 US gal)
- Lubricant cap.: 530 L (120 imp gal; 140 US gal)
- Coolant cap.: 208 L (46 imp gal; 55 US gal)
- Water cap.: 22 L (4.8 imp gal; 5.8 US gal)
- Sandbox cap.: 0.40 L (0.088 imp gal; 0.11 US gal)
- Power supply: 110 V DC supply
- Prime mover: ALCO 251-B
- RPM range: 400-1100
- Engine type: Inline-6 diesel
- Aspiration: Turbo-supercharged
- Displacement: 267 mm (10.5 in)
- Generator: DC
- Traction motors: 6 DC GE 752E6
  - Rating 1 hour: 1040A
  - Continuous: 1055A
- Head end power: 110V DC supply
- Cylinders: 6
- Cylinder size: 228.6 mm × 266.7 mm (9.00 in × 10.50 in)
- Transmission: Diesel–electric transmission
- MU working: 2
- Loco brake: OriginallyVacuum, Air
- Train brakes: Vacuum
- Air tank cap.: 22 L (4.8 imp gal; 5.8 US gal)
- Compressor: 444.8 L (97.8 imp gal; 117.5 US gal)
- Exhauster: 1,782.9 L (392.2 imp gal; 471.0 US gal)
Performance figures
- Maximum speed: 109 km/h (68 mph)
- Power output: Max: 1,065 hp (794 kW); Site rated: 994 hp (741 kW)
- Tractive effort
  - Starting: 31.500 t (31 long tons; 35 short tons)
  - Continuous: 32.300 t (32 long tons; 36 short tons)
- Factor of adh.: 0.25
Career
- Operators: Indian Railways private industries
- Numbers: 19087-19107
- Locale: Mughalsarai and bondamuda, Leased and sold to some industrial concerns
- Delivered: 1967
- First run: 1967
- Preserved: None
- Current owner: Indian Railway, private industries
- Disposition: Active

The class WDS-5 is a diesel–electric locomotive used by Indian Railways for shunting and doing departmental works. The model name stands for broad gauge (W), Diesel (D), Shunting (S) engine. The WDS-6 is used all over India.

== History ==
The class was imported in 1967 to address the need for powerful shunting locomotive that will be able to haul 20-24 coach rakes. The previous WDS-4 class was underpowered for this kind of operation. They were manufactured by BLW varanasi using the kits provided by ALCO. The WDS-5 can easily be recognized by their shot nose and flat-ended cab at one end. Some were sold and transferred to industrial concerns and public sectors, but have IR road numbers on them.

== Locomotive sheds ==
Zone	Name	Shed Code	Quantity
East Central Railway	Pt. DD Upadhyaya Junction	DDU	1
South Eastern Railway	Bondamunda	BNDM	3
Total Locomotives in Service as of October 2021			4

== See also ==
- Rail transport in India#History
- Locomotives of India
- Rail transport in India
- Indian locomotive class WDS-6

=== Bibliography ===
- Hughes, Hugh (1996). Indian Locomotives: Part 4 – 1941–1990. Harrow, Middlesex: The Continental Railway Circle. ISBN 0-9521655-1-1. OCLC 35135033.
