= Sheopur =

Sheopur श्योपुर
- City
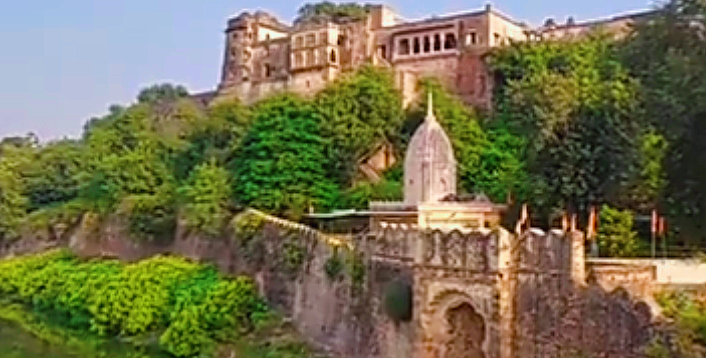
- Sheopur fort
- Nickname: "The City by the Seep"
- Location in Madhya Pradesh, India Sheopur (India)
- Coordinates: 25.67°N 76.7°E
- Country: India
- State: Madhya Pradesh
- District: Sheopur
- Region: Bundelkhand
- Elevation: 229 m (751 ft)

Population (2011)
  - Total: 105,026

Languages
  - Official: Hindi and Hadoti
- Time zone: UTC+5:30 (IST)
- PIN: 476337
- Vehicle registration: MP-25
- Sex ratio: 932 ♂/♀
- Website: sheopur.nic.in

Sheopur is a city in Madhya Pradesh state of central India. It is the administrative headquarters of Sheopur District. The City is situated on the right bank of the Seep River, a tributary of the Chambal. Thus the city derives its name from "Seep-pur" meaning "town on the Seep". Later, colloquially it came to be known as Sheopur. Sheopur is linked by narrow gauge rail to Gwalior (No longer in operation). Chambal River is just 25 km, which forms the boundary between Rajasthan and MP states.

Sheopur is located in the northern part of Madhya Pradesh. Locations in the district include Vijaipur, Karahal, and Badoda. The Palpur (Kuno) wildlife sanctuary and the Kaketo reservoir are located in this district. Woodcarving is practiced in Sheopur, where craftspersons make wooden ceilings, doors, lintels, pipes, masks, toys, stands, windows, wooden memorials, flower vases, bedposts, and cradle posts.

The important rivers like Chambal, Seep and Kuno drain the district. The Chambal, which originates in the Indore district's janapav hills, forms the northwestern boundary of Madhya Pradesh with Rajasthan.

== History ==
=== Early mentions ===
There is no conclusive documented source available that traces the historical origin of Sheopur Fort. However a Jain pillar edict dated 1026 A.D. refers to the existence of the Sheopur fort. The 17th century poet Khadag Rai of Gwalior, in his renowned work Gopanchala Akhyana mentions Sheopur. According to his account the king of Nareshar Ajay Pal (1194–1219) had declared Sheopur as his capital.

=== Islamic Era ===
In 1301 A.D. Alauddin Khalji after capturing the Ranthambhor fort, captured the Sheopur fort as well, which was under king Hammir Dev at that time. In 1489, Sultan Mahmood Khalji of Malwa captured and established it as an integrated part of the Malwa Sultanate.

In 1542, Sher Shah Suri captured the Sheopur fort. A prayer ground (idgah) built in his time and a grand mausoleum built by his son, Islam Shah, in memory of his commander Munabber Khan are examples of the architecture of that time. After that, Surjan Singh Hada, the King of Princely state of Bundi captured Sheopur fort.

=== Gaur Rule ===
According to tradition the city of Sheopur and its fort in present-day Madhya Pradesh were founded by the Gaur Rajputs' chief, Indra Singh, in 1537.The first historical reference to the city dates to 1570.Sarwar fort of Sarwar district Rajasthan was also built by Gaur dynasty kings.

The 225 years history of the Sipahad kingdom is called a history and cultural identity. This is reflected in architectural remains, which are traditions of performing arts, paintings, sculpture and style of living. The individual palace of Narsingh Gaur, Rani mahal or Gorji mahal are examples of Gaur architecture. The chhatris built as a mark of respect for the kings Indar Singh Gaur and Kishor Das Gaur after their demise are silent and solemn examples of crafted architecture. The Gaurs continued to rule from it until they succumbed to the Scindias.

=== Scindia Rule ===
Scindias remained in control of the fort till India acquired independence. They contributed to the grandeur of the fort by adding new dimensions to its resplendent remarks. The late Maharaja Madavrao Scindia built a Diwan-e-Aam, The Darbar Hall, and a state guesthouse presently the Diwan-e-Aam.

=== Conservation ===
On the site is a Sahariya Museum, which is a window on the world of Saharia life partners, who rank as one of few existing primitive tribes of India. A few portion of the fort have been taken over by the M.P. Archeological Department for protections and conservation.

== Education ==
The following colleges offer graduate and post-graduate level certifications:

Institutions affiliated to Jiwaji University:

- Government Madhavrao Scindia P.G. College
- Adarsh Mahavidhyalaya
- Sheopur Institute of Professional Studies
- Shri Ganesh Mahavidhyalaya Vijaipur
- Vinayak College
- Shri Ram Institute (College) Sheopur
- Government Polytechnic College Sheopur
- Government P.G. college Sheopur
- Government Adarsh Girls College Sheopur

There are several schools offering both C.B.S.E. and state-board syllabus.

C.B.S.E. schools:

- Jawahar Navodaya Vidhyalaya
- Kendriya Vidhyalaya
- St. Pius School
- Modern Convent School
- Rajeev Gandhi Memorial Boarding School

State Board schools (public and private):

- Excellence School
- Govt. Girls School
- Hajareswar School
- Saraswati Shishu/Vidya Mandir
- Harihar School
- Gurunanak Public School
- Madhavrao Scindia School
- Nehru School
- Future Star Convent School

The following institutions offer pre-primary education:

- SR Kids - A Pre School
- SR International School
- Jeevan Academy

== Transport ==
- By Air: The nearest airport to Sheopur is Gwalior. This airport is well connected with Jaipur, Delhi, Bhopal, Mumbai.
- By Rail: Sheopur Kalan railway station lies on the Gwalior Light Railway of the former princely state of Gwalior (now part of the Central Railway in Madhya Pradesh) these 209 km of 610mm gauge lines were originally sponsored by the Maharaja of Gwalior, reaching Sheopur in 1909. This railway line has been nominated by Indian government for the World Heritage site.
- By Road: Sheopur is connected by regular bus services with Gwalior, Morena, Sawai Madhopur, Shivpuri, Baran, Kota and Bhopal. Sheopur is 211 km from Gwalior, 195 km from Morena, 139 km from Kota and 61 km from Sawai Madhopur.

== Division ==
The district is divided into two sub divisions of Sheopur and Vijaypur. Five Tehsils (Sheopur, Karhal, Vijaypur, Baroda, Beerpur), three blocks (Sheopur, Karhal, Vijaypur, birpur) and three Nagarpalikas (Sheopur, Baroda, Vijaypur).

== Geography ==
Sheopur is located at 25.67°N 76.7°E. It has an average elevation of 229 metres (751 feet).

=== Physiography ===
The general physiography of the terrain is hilly. It comes under the Vindhya series. The sanctuary falls in the semi-arid zone and has a typical terrain of Central Indian highlands, interspersed with woodlands and meadows. The soil is sandy and sandy-loam, showing a spatial variation in depth. River kuno, a tributary of the Chambal, vertically bisects the sanctuary from north to south. It occupies an area of 5.90 km^{2} in the sanctuary. A number of major nullahs like Lankahkhoh, Kudikheda, Durredi, Aamkhoh originate from the gorges located on the west, join river Kuno. Similarly, the Dabhona Nallah, Naharkunda Nallah, Gangoli Nallah etc. originating from the eastern Khohs, meet the Kuno river at various sites.

== Climate ==
The average rainfall in the area is 750 mm per year. The maximum temperature can rise up to 49 degree C while the minimum temperature recorded has been 2 degree C.

Climate data for Sheopur (1991–2020, extremes 1951–2020)
Month	Jan	Feb	Mar	Apr	May	Jun	Jul	Aug	Sep	Oct	Nov	Dec	Year
Record high °C (°F)	32.0 (89.6)	37.2 (99.0)	42.0 (107.6)	46.0 (114.8)	48.8 (119.8)	48.0 (118.4)	46.4 (115.5)	41.8 (107.2)	41.2 (106.2)	40.8 (105.4)	37.3 (99.1)	32.6 (90.7)	48.8 (119.8)
Mean daily maximum °C (°F)	23.1 (73.6)	27.8 (82.0)	33.8 (92.8)	38.8 (101.8)	42.7 (108.9)	41.0 (105.8)	34.8 (94.6)	32.6 (90.7)	34.0 (93.2)	34.4 (93.9)	29.8 (85.6)	25.2 (77.4)	33.2 (91.8)
Mean daily minimum °C (°F)	8.4 (47.1)	10.9 (51.6)	16.5 (61.7)	22.0 (71.6)	26.8 (80.2)	27.7 (81.9)	26.0 (78.8)	24.7 (76.5)	24.6 (76.3)	19.5 (67.1)	14.2 (57.6)	9.6 (49.3)	19.1 (66.4)
Record low °C (°F)	−2.2 (28.0)	1.1 (34.0)	4.6 (40.3)	8.8 (47.8)	16.2 (61.2)	17.4 (63.3)	15.8 (60.4)	15.2 (59.4)	15.1 (59.2)	8.8 (47.8)	4.4 (39.9)	0.0 (32.0)	−2.2 (28.0)
Average rainfall mm (inches)	5.3 (0.21)	6.7 (0.26)	3.3 (0.13)	4.4 (0.17)	4.9 (0.19)	82.5 (3.25)	268.5 (10.57)	227.2 (8.94)	86.0 (3.39)	14.2 (0.56)	8.3 (0.33)	1.5 (0.06)	712.6 (28.06)
Average rainy days	0.5	0.6	0.5	0.6	0.5	3.8	9.7	9.3	4.4	0.4	0.8	0.1	31.2
Average relative humidity (%) (at 17:30 IST)	53	43	34	26	22	41	69	75	62	46	46	56	48
Source: India Meteorological Department

== Demographics ==
As of 2001 India census, Sheopur had a population of 105026. Males constitute 53% of the population and females 47%. Sheopur has an average literacy rate of 72%, lower than the national average of 76%: male literacy is 76%, and female literacy is 56%. In Sheopur, 17% of the population is under 6 years of age.

Main schools of Sheopur are Jawahar Navodaya Vidyalaya, Govt. Excellence School, St. Pius School, Modern School and Rajeev Gandhi Memorial Boarding School. World-famous lion project in Kuno palpur is situated 70 km from the city.

In last few years level of education has been improved surprisingly as many students have cracked in competitive examination like CAT, CLAT, AIMAT, IIT, AIEEE, PET and AIPMT, etc.

== Economy ==
About 50 percent of the geographical area is available for cultivation. About 58.74 percent of the cultivable area in the district is irrigated. Canal is the major source of irrigation. Wheat is the most important food grain grown in the district. Mustard is the most important oil seed grown in the district. In Sheopur District there are total 156 running small scale industries, based on pipes, masks, toys, doors, stands, windows, wooden memorials, flower vases, bedposts and cradle posts etc.

== Government ==
The District Collector is the head of the Sheopur district, who is in charge of all the activities of Sheopur. municipal head of the sheopur town is the president of nagar Palika. while the M.L.A. and M.P. are the political heads of the district.

== Culture ==
In Sheopur the major spoken language is Hindi and local dialect is Hadoti.

Folk Dances:-

Gadaria and Ahir Dance:-

This dance is related to people who have traditionally been in the business of cattle herding. In different parts of the state these people are known by different castes such as Ahir, Baredi, Gwal, Rawat, Raut, Gwala etc.

Gadariya or Yadav dance of Bundelkhand:-

This dance has been associated with the biggest Hindu festival Diwali. On the night of Diwali people worship Laxmi, the Hindu goddess of wealth (after all no body can live without money), and cattle. Next day on the occasion of "Padva" or "Parva" cattle are sent to jungles or ranches after being decorated with flowers and garlands. They are given special dishes as food. Yadav dance is performed on the same occasion. Dancers dance in a circular path while singing songs. Sometimes they sit or lie down on earth and suddenly they restart their dance. Rhythm of the song is very low in starting and increases with time. Music instruments are started only when two lines of the song are finished. Primarily these are two line couplets. Sometimes these are in form of questions and answers. This dance continues till Kartik Purnima.

Dress:-

Dancers, instrument beaters and their associates wear a clean turban on head. Some people like to put on Dhoti up to knees (long cloth wore by men enwrapping their waist). Some people specially dancers wear colorful shorts. Dancers also keep bunch of peacock feathers.

Saharia Dances:-

Saharias are tribal people who live in jungles. They work in farms and also collect medicinal plants from jungles. There are several dances of Saharias. Some of the important ones are: Lur Dance, Lanhgi Dance, Dul-Dul Ghodi Dance, Raya Dance, Ada-Khada Dance.

Lur dance of Saharias:-

This dance is performed on the occasion of marriage starting from the day of ritual of "Haldi" (In this ritual whole body is pasted with turmeric and after sometime it is removed so the body is cleaned) till the arrival of Barat (Bridegroom comes to the house of the bride with his relatives and friends for marriage ceremony).

Lanhgi dance of Saharias:-

This dance is also known as Danda (baton) dance because Saharias dance with small batons in their hands with which they strike at each other and perform Lanhgi dance. Only men are allowed in it. This dance is performed on the occasion of Bhujarias, Teja ji puja and Aekadashi etc.

Dul-Dul Ghori dance:-

This dance is performed on the occasion of marriage by males. In this dance a hollow case of ghori (a mare) is prepared of bamboo sticks. The dancer stands in the hollow place and dances. (Depicts various movements of mare.) There is also a joker in women clothing. People sing folk songs during the dance.

Musical instruments:-

Mradang, Dholak, Ramtula, Dhapli, Manzira, Jhanz etc. are used in this dance. Famous Celeb : - Gajanan Madhav Muktibodh who was one of the most prominent Hindi poets, essayist, literary and political critic, and fiction writers, was born in sheopur. Every year Muktibodh festival is celebrated in the city.
