= Duraundha =

Village in Siwan, Bihar

Coordinates: 26°05′N 84°27′E

Duraundha is a village in Barabanki district of Uttar Pradesh, India. The village is located at the bank of river Gomti. It is located 55 kilometres east of state capital, Lucknow. The completed Golden Quadrilateral highway system passes 7 kilometres from Duraundha, connecting it to much of the rest of India.
