= Dongargaon =

Dongargaon is the name of several towns or villages within India, and may refer to:

- Dongargaon, Chhattisgarh, a village in Rajnandgaon district of Chhattisgarh
- Dongargaon, Agar Malwa, a village in the Agar Malwa district of Madhya Pradesh
- Dongargaon, Bhopal, a village in the Bhopal district of Madhya Pradesh
- Dongargaon, Indore, a village in the Indore district of Madhya Pradesh
- Dongargaon, Mawal, a village in the Pune district of Maharashtra

== See also ==
- Dongargarh, a town in the Rajnandgaon district of Chhattisgarh
