= Howrah–Mathura Chambal Express =

Passenger train in India

Overview
- Service type: Express
- First service: 7 March 1996; 29 years ago
- Current operator: North Central Railways

Route
- Termini: Howrah (HWH); Mathura (MTJ)
- Stops: 32
- Distance travelled: 1,460 km (907 mi)
- Average journey time: 26 hours 55 minutes
- Service frequency: Bi-weekly
- Train number: 12177 / 12178

On-board services
- Classes: AC 2 tier, AC 3 tier, Sleeper class, General Unreserved
- Seating arrangements: Yes
- Sleeping arrangements: Yes
- Catering facilities: E-catering
- Observation facilities: Rake sharing with 12175/12176 Howrah–Gwalior Chambal Express
- Baggage facilities: Below the seats

Technical
- Rolling stock: LHB coach
- Track gauge: 1,676 mm (5 ft 6 in)
- Operating speed: 55 km/h (34 mph) average with halts.
Route map
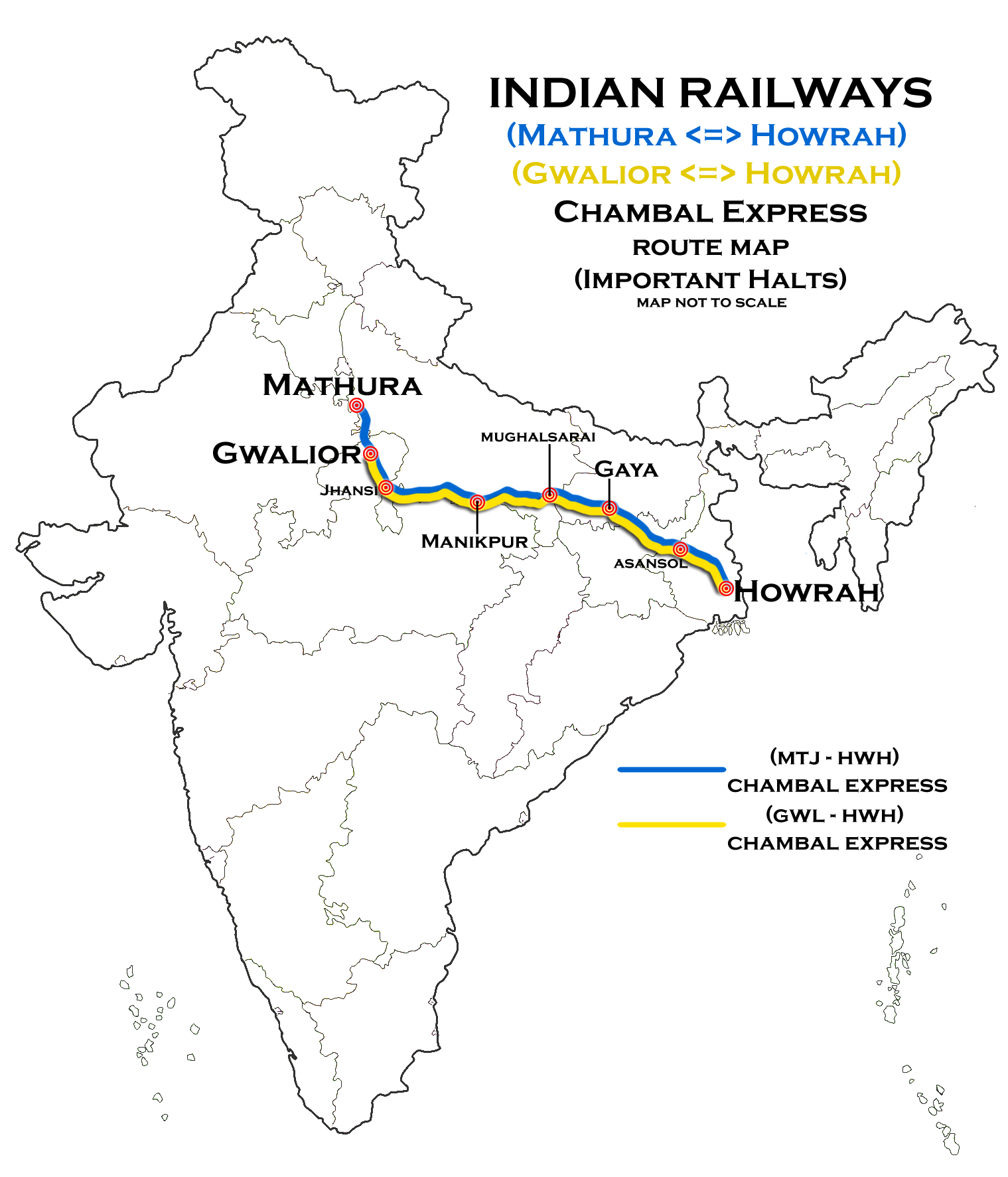

The 12177 / 12178 Howrah–Mathura Chambal Express is an express train of the Indian Railways connecting Howrah in West Bengal and Mathura Junction of Uttar Pradesh. It is currently being operated with 12175/12176 train numbers on a weekly basis.

== Service ==
The 12177/Howrah–Mathura Chambal Express has an average speed of 55 km/h and covers 1460 km in 26 hrs 55 mins. 12178/Mathura–Howrah Chambal Express has an average speed of 55 km/h and covers 1294 km in 26 hrs 20 mins.

== Route & halts ==
The important halts of the train are:

- Howrah
- Barddhaman Junction
- Durgapur
- Asansol Junction
- Dhanbad Junction
- Netaji Subhas Chandra Bose Gomoh
- Parasnath
- Koderma Junction
- Gaya Junction
- Dehri-on-Sone
- Sasaram Junction
- Bhabua Road
- Mughalsarai Junction
- Chunar
- Mirzapur
- Vindhyachal
- Cheoki Junction
- Manikpur Junction
- Banda
- Mahoba Junction
- Kulpahar
- Harpalpur
- Jhansi Junction
- Datia
- Dabra
- Gwalior Junction
- Morena
- Agra Cantonment
- Mathura Junction

== Coach composition ==
The train has standard ICF rakes with a maximum speed of 110 km/h. The train consists of 20 coaches:

- 1 AC II Tier
- 2 AC III Tier
- 10 sleeper coaches
- 5 general
- 2 second-class luggage/parcel vans

== Traction ==
As the route is fully electrified, it is hauled by Howrah Loco Shed-based WAP-7 electric locomotive on its entire journey.

== Rake sharing ==
The train shares its rake with 12175/12176 Howrah–Gwalior Chambal Express.

== See also ==
- Howrah railway station
- Mathura Junction railway station
- Chambal Express
