= Raigarh–Hazrat Nizamuddin Gondwana Express =

Train in India

Overview
- Service type: Superfast
- Locale: Chhattisgarh, Madhya Pradesh, Maharashtra, Uttar Pradesh & Delhi
- Current operator: Northern Railway

Route
- Termini: Hazrat Nizamuddin (NZM); Raigarh (RIG)
- Stops: 32
- Distance travelled: 1,630 km (1,013 mi)
- Average journey time: 25 hours 35 minutes
- Service frequency: 5 days a week
- Train number: 12409 / 12410

On-board services
- Classes: AC 2 tier, AC 3 tier, Sleeper class, Second class (unreserved)
- Seating arrangements: Yes
- Sleeping arrangements: Yes
- Catering facilities: On-board catering, E-catering
- Observation facilities: Large windows
- Baggage facilities: Available
- Other facilities: Below the seats

Technical
- Rolling stock: LHB coach
- Track gauge: 1,676 mm (5 ft 6 in) broad gauge
- Operating speed: 64 km/h (40 mph) average including halts.
- Rake sharing: Rake sharing with 12405/12406 Bhusaval–Hazrat Nizamuddin Gondwana Express
Route map
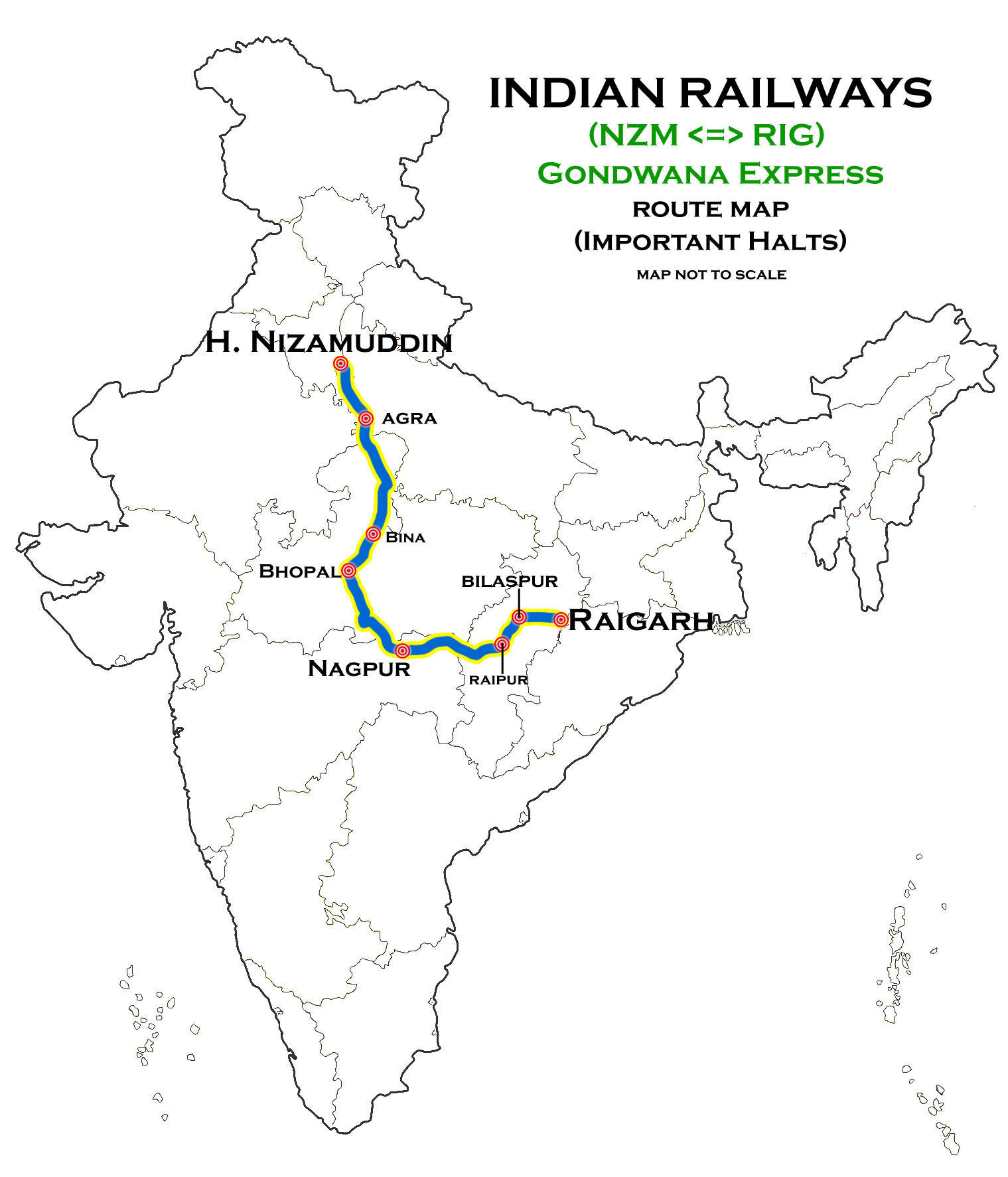

The 12409 / 12410 Raigarh–Hazrat Nizamuddin Gondwana Express is a Superfast Express train belonging to Indian Railways that runs between Raigarh and Hazrat Nizamuddin in India. It is a 5-day service. It operates as train number 12409 from Raigarh to Hazrat Nizamuddin and as train number 12410 in the reverse direction.

== Coaches ==
The 12409/12410 Raigarh–Hazrat Nizamuddin Gondwana Express presently has 2 AC 2 tier, 10 AC 3 tier, 2 Sleeper class & 5 General Unreserved coaches.

As with most train services in India, coach composition may be amended at the discretion of Indian Railways depending on demand.

== Service ==
The 12409 Raigarh–Hazrat Nizamuddin Gondwana Express covers the distance of 1626 kilometers in 27 hours and 55 mins (58.24 km/h) and 27 hours 40 mins as 12410 Nizamuddin–Raigarh Gondwana Express (58.77 km/h).

As its average speed in both directions is above 55 km/h as per Indian Railways rules, its fare has a Superfast surcharge. In addition, it gets priority over local (commuter) trains, standard express, passenger trains and most freight trains.

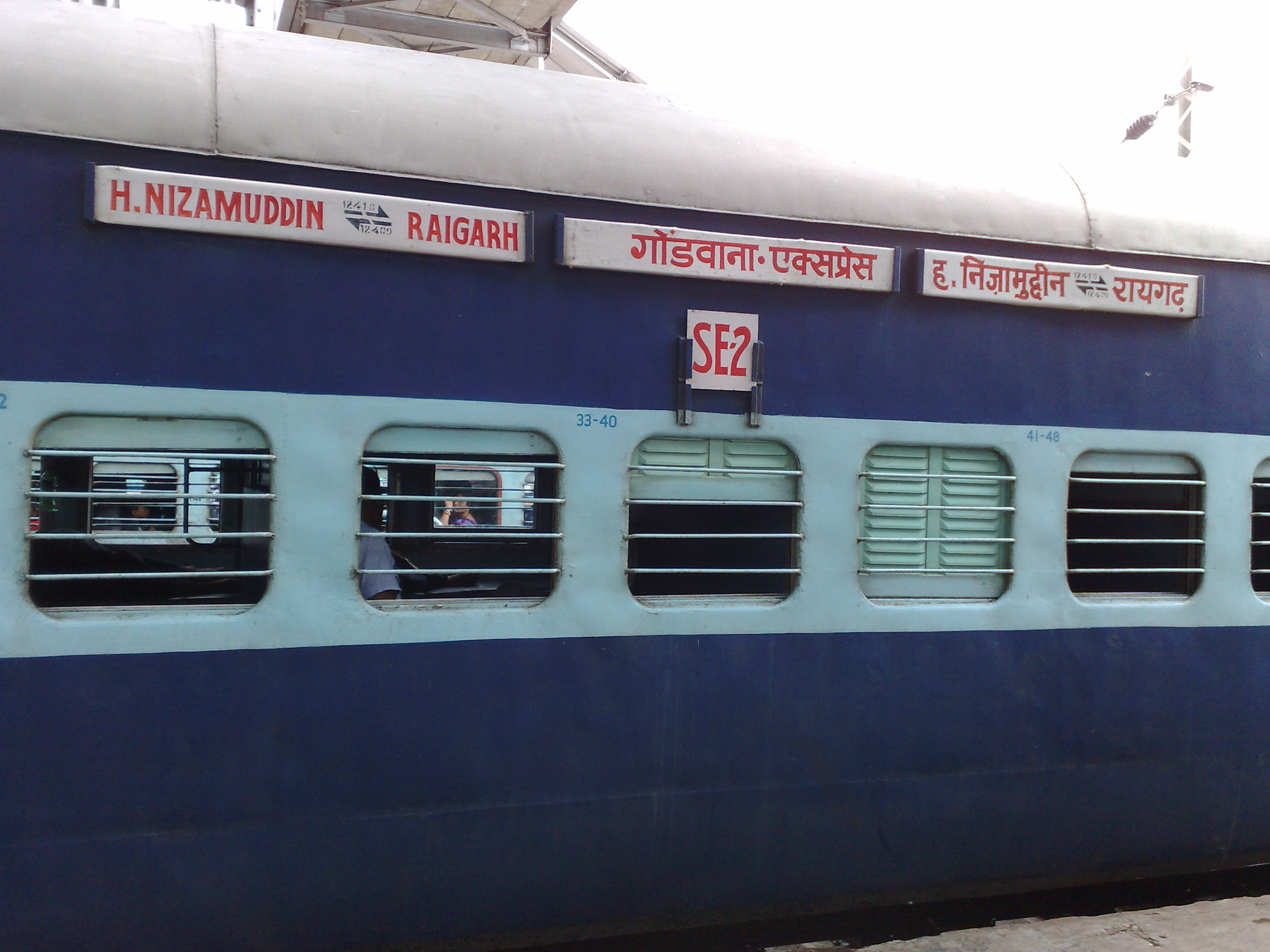
12409 Raigarh–Nizamuddin Gondwana Express – Sleeper class

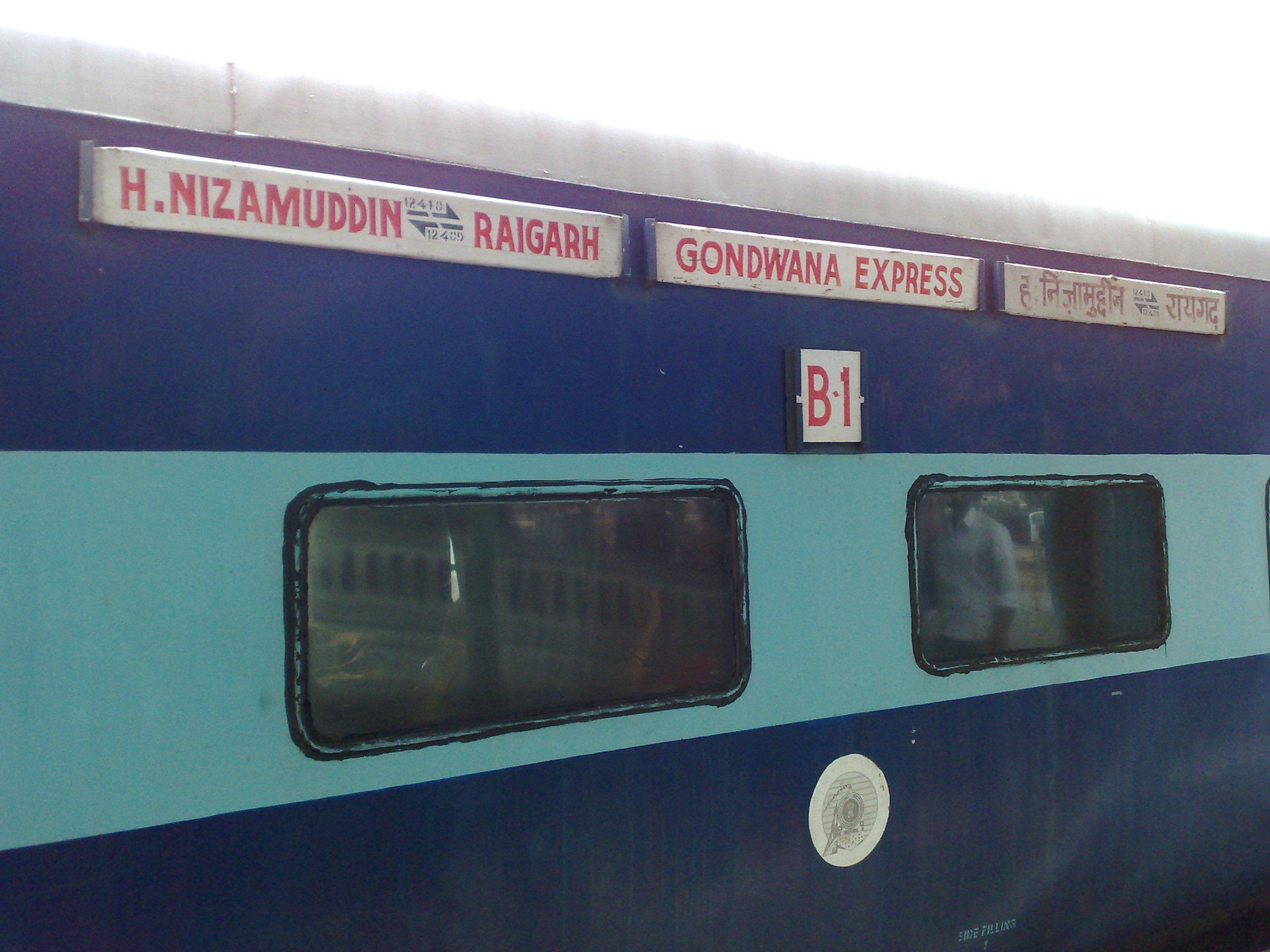
12409 Raigarh–Nizamuddin Gondwana Express – AC 3 tier coach

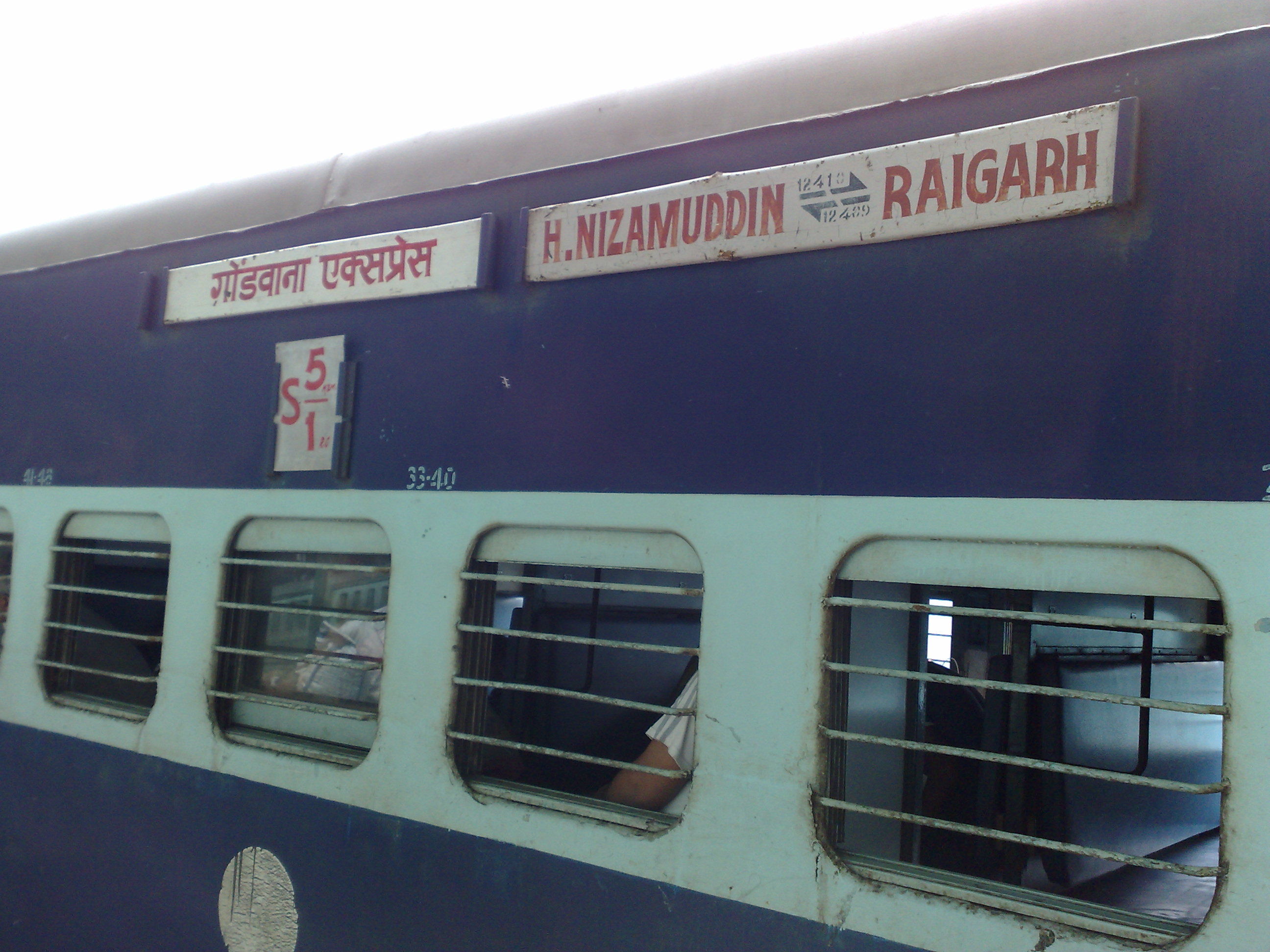
12409 Raigarh–Nizamuddin Gondwana Express – Coach S1

== Traction ==
It is hauled by a Tughlakabad Loco Shed-based WAP-7 electric locomotive on its entire journey.

== Route and halts ==
- Raigarh
- Kharsia
- Champa
- Akaltara
- Bilaspur Junction
- Bhatapara
- Tilda Newra
- Raipur Junction
- Durg Junction
- Rajnandgaon
- Dongargarh
- Gondia Junction
- Tumsar Road
- Nagpur Junction
- Amla Junction
- Itarsi Junction
- Narmadapuram
- Bhopal Junction
- Bina Junction
- Lalitpur Junction
- Virangana Lakshmibai Junction
- Datia
- Agra Cantonment
- Mathura Junction
- Hazrat Nizamuddin

== Rake sharing ==
The train shares its rake with 12405/12406 Bhusaval–Hazrat Nizamuddin Gondwana Express.

== Incidents and accidents ==
=== Bombs on the train ===
In January 2015, a bag containing eight crude bombs was discovered in Gondwana Express, after a train ticket checker noticed it around 3PM. The train was halted at Sihora Road Station, the low intensity bombs were defused, after which the journey was resumed. Later, a 40 year old engineer Vineet Kumar from Bihar was held for planting these bombs.

=== Train running status ===
Gondwana Express has a history of being delayed regularly by a few hours. Once the train was delayed by 17 hours during a fog that hit Bhopal in December 2016.

== See also ==
- Indian Railways
