= Jhansi–Etawah Link Express =

Train in India

Jhansi - Gwalior - Etawah Link Express

Overview
- Service type: Express
- First service: 16 September 2016; 9 years ago
- Current operator: North Western Railway zone

Route
- Termini: Jhansi Junction (JHS); Etawah Junction (ETW)
- Stops: 12
- Distance travelled: 216 km (134 mi)
- Average journey time: 5 hours 15 minutes
- Service frequency: Daily (Note: Runs seven days in a week for every direction.)
- Train number: 11801/11802

On-board services
- Classes: AC 2 tier, AC 3 tier, Sleeper Class, General Unreserved
- Seating arrangements: No
- Sleeping arrangements: Yes
- Catering facilities: No
- Observation facilities: Rake Sharing with 21801/ 21802 Jhansi–Indore Link Express & 11125/11126 Indore–Gwalior Intercity Express
- Entertainment facilities: No
- Baggage facilities: Below the seats

Technical
- Rolling stock: 2
- Track gauge: 1,676 mm (5 ft 6 in)
- Operating speed: 40 km/h (25 mph)

Jhansi - Gwalior - Etawah Link Express is an intercity train of the Indian Railways connecting Jhansi Junction in Uttar Pradesh and Etawah Junction of Uttar Pradesh. It is currently being operated with 11801/11802 train numbers on a daily basis.

== Service ==
The 11801/Jhansi - Gwalior - Etawah Link Express has an average speed of 41 km/h and covers 216 km in 5 hrs 15 mins. 11802/Etawah - Gwalior - Jhansi Link Express has an average speed of 40 km/h and 216 km in 5 hrs 25 mins.

== Route and halts ==
The important halts of the train are:

- Jhansi Junction
- Datia
- Dabra
- Gwalior Junction
- Bhind
- Etawah Junction

== Coach composite ==
The train has standard ICF rakes with max speed of 110 kmph. The train consists of 8 coaches :

- 6 General
- 2 Second-class Luggage/parcel van
