= Bhusaval–Hazrat Nizamuddin Gondwana Express =

Train in India

Overview
- Service type: Superfast Express
- Locale: Maharashtra, Madhya Pradesh, Uttar Pradesh & Delhi
- Current operator(s): Northern Railway

Route
- Termini: Bhusaval Junction (BSL); Hazrat Nizamuddin (NZM)
- Stops: 27
- Distance travelled: 1,478 km (918 mi)
- Average journey time: 23 hours 10 minutes
- Service frequency: Bi-Weekly
- Train number(s): 12405 / 12406

On-board services
- Class(es): AC 2 tier, AC 3 tier, Sleeper class, General Unreserved
- Seating arrangements: Yes
- Sleeping arrangements: Yes
- Catering facilities: On-board catering, E-catering
- Observation facilities: Large windows
- Baggage facilities: Available
- Other facilities: Below the seats

Technical
- Rolling stock: LHB coach
- Track gauge: 1,676 mm (5 ft 6 in); Broad Gauge
- Operating speed: 64 km/h (40 mph) average including halts.
- Rake sharing: Rake sharing with 12409/12410 Raigarh–Hazrat Nizamuddin Gondwana Express

The 12405 / 12406 Bhusaval–Hazrat Nizamuddin Gondwana Express is a Superfast Express train belonging to Indian Railways – Northern Railway zone that runs between Bhusaval Junction and Hazrat Nizamuddin in India.

It operates as train number 12405 from Bhusaval Junction to Hazrat Nizamuddin and as train number 12406 in the reverse direction, serving the states of Maharashtra, Madhya Pradesh, Uttar Pradesh and Delhi.

== Coaches ==
The 12405 / 06 Bhusaval–Hazrat Nizamuddin Gondwana Express has 1 AC 2 tier, 2 AC 3 tier, 13 Sleeper class, 3 General Unreserved and 2 SLR (Seating cum Luggage Rake) coaches. It does not carry a pantry car.

As is customary with most train services in India, coach composition may be amended at the discretion of Indian Railways depending on demand.

== Service ==
The 12405 Bhusaval–Hazrat Nizamuddin Gondwana Express covers the distance of 1476 kilometres in 25 hours 45 mins (57.32 km/h) and in 24 hours 25 mins as 12406 Hazrat Nizamuddin–Bhusaval Gondwana Express (60.45 km/h).

As the average speed of the train is above 55 km/h (34 mph), as per Indian Railways rules, its fare includes a Superfast surcharge.

== Routeing ==
The train runs from Bhusaval Junction via Akola Junction, Badnera, Wardha Junction, Nagpur Junction, Amla Junction, Betul, Itarsi Junction, Bhopal Junction, Bina Junction, Jhansi Junction, Gwalior, Agra Cantonment to Hazrat Nizamuddin.

== Traction ==
As the entire route is fully electrified, it is hauled by a Tughlakabad Loco Shed-based WAP-7 electric locomotive on its entire journey.

== Timings ==
- 12405 Bhusaval–Hazrat Nizamuddin Gondwana Express leaves Bhusaval Junction every Tuesday and Sunday at 05:40 hrs IST and reaches Hazrat Nizamuddin at 07:25 hrs IST the next day.
- 12406 Hazrat Nizamuddin–Bhusaval Gondwana Express leaves Hazrat Nizamuddin every Friday and Sunday at 15:25 hrs IST and reaches Bhusaval Junction at 15:50 hrs IST the next day.

== Rake sharing ==
The train shares its rake with 12409/12410 Raigarh–Hazrat Nizamuddin Gondwana Express.
