= Kulpahar railway station =

Railway station in Uttar Pradesh, India

Kulpahar Railway Station
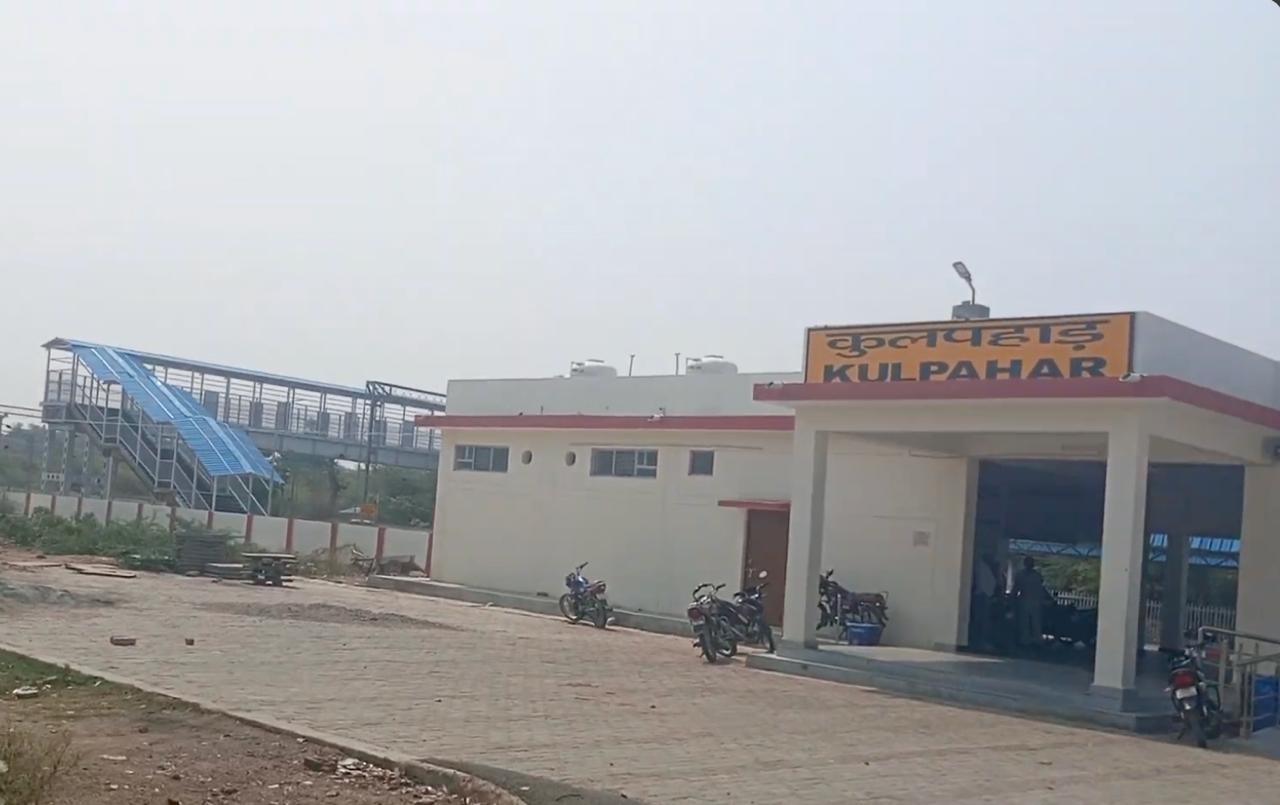
- Station Building City Side Entry

General information
- Location: Kulpahar, Uttar Pradesh; India
- Coordinates: 25.2826°N 79.8482°E
- Elevation: 210 metres (690 ft)
- System: Indian Railways station
- Owner: Indian Railways
- Operator: North Central Railway
- Line: Jhansi–Banda section
- Platforms: 2
- Tracks: 4
- Connections: Auto stand

Construction
- Structure type: Standard (on-ground station)
- Parking: Yes
- Cycle facilities: No
- Accessible: Yes

Other information
- Status: Double electric line
- Station code: KLAR
- Zone(s): North Central Railway
- Division(s): Jhansi

Services
Railwire Wifi internet service
Location
- Location within India Location within Uttar Pradesh

Kulpahar railway station is a railway station of Bundelkhand region in Mahoba district, Uttar Pradesh. Its code is KLAR. It serves Kulpahar city. The station is a category NSG5 station of Jhansi railway division of the North Central Railway zone.

== Adarsh Station Scheme ==
Kulpahar railway station was declared adarsh railway station by the Ministry of Railways government of India in the year 2012.

== Amrit Bharat Station Scheme ==
In the year 2023 ministry of railways launched Amrit Bharat Station Scheme; Kulpahar railway station is covered under this scheme for second phase work, which is expected to be completed by the end of the year 2025.

== Amenities ==
The following amenities are available at this railway station

- Waiting hall
- Automated unreserved ticket vending machine
- Computerized UTS cum PRS ticket counter
- Automated train arrival/departure announcement system
- Parking
- Ramp to enter and exit station building for disabled passengers
- Water coolers on platforms
- Snacks stalls on platforms
- Toilets and bathrooms at platforms
- Enquiry counter
- Train display board
- Seats/benches on platforms
- Drinking Water taps on platforms
- Free Wi-fi service in station premises
- Second entrance to the station
- Foot overbridge

The following amenities are under construction

- Separate waiting hall for female passengers
- Separate waiting hall for upper class travelers
- Coach indicator boards at platforms
- Train display boards in circulating area
- Retiring rooms
- ATM near circulating area

== Trains ==
At present 22 odd trains have stoppage at this station, which includes Sampark Kranti Express trains, super fast trains and other Express and passenger trains. Some of the major trains stopping at this station are:

- Bundelkhand Express
- Uttar Pradesh Sampark Kranti Express
- Khajuraho–Udaipur City Express
- Chambal Express
- Howrah–Mathura Chambal Express
