= Dongargaon, Indore =

Dongargaon
- Village
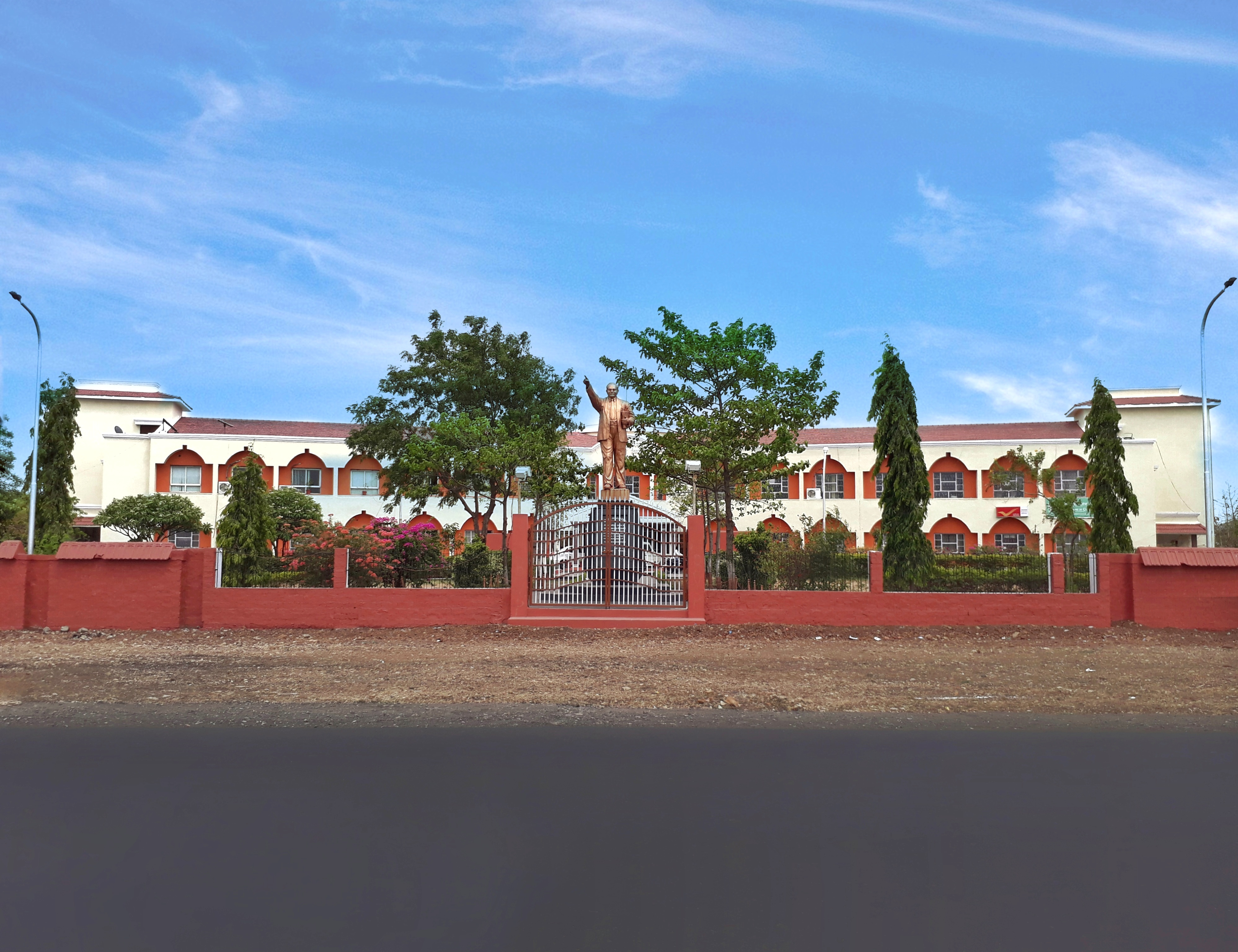
- Dr. B.R. Ambedkar University of Social Sciences

- Location of Dongargaon in Madhya Pradesh Dongargaon (India)
- Coordinates: 22.5438562°N 75.740819°E
- Country: India
- State: Madhyapradesh
- District: Indore
- City: Mhow

Population (2011)
  - Total: 3,091

Languages
  - Official: Hindi
- Time zone: UTC+5:30 (IST)
- PIN: 453441
- Vehicle registration: MP
- Sex ratio: 936 ♂/♀

Dongargaon is a village located in Indore District, Madhya Pradesh, India.

== Geography ==
Dogargaon is located in Mhow tehsil of Indore District in Madhya Pradesh. Dogargaon is represented by Dr. Ambedkar Nagar-Mh assembly constituency in State Assembly and Dhar parliamentary constituency in Lok Sabha.

== Universities and colleges ==
- Dr. B.R. Ambedkar University of Social Sciences
