= Howrah–Gwalior Chambal Express =

Passenger train in India

Overview
- Service type: Express
- First service: 4 November 1987; 38 years ago
- Current operator: North Central Railways

Route
- Termini: Howrah (HWH); Gwalior (GWL)
- Stops: 29
- Distance travelled: 1,288 km (800 mi)
- Average journey time: 23 hours 10 minutes
- Service frequency: Bi-weekly
- Train number: 12175 / 12176

On-board services
- Classes: AC 2 tier, AC 3 tier, Sleeper class, General Unreserved
- Seating arrangements: Yes
- Sleeping arrangements: Yes
- Catering facilities: E-catering
- Observation facilities: Rake sharing with 12177/12178 Howrah–Mathura Chambal Express
- Baggage facilities: Above the head

Technical
- Rolling stock: LHB coach
- Track gauge: 1,676 mm (5 ft 6 in)
- Operating speed: 55 km/h (34 mph) average with halts
Route map
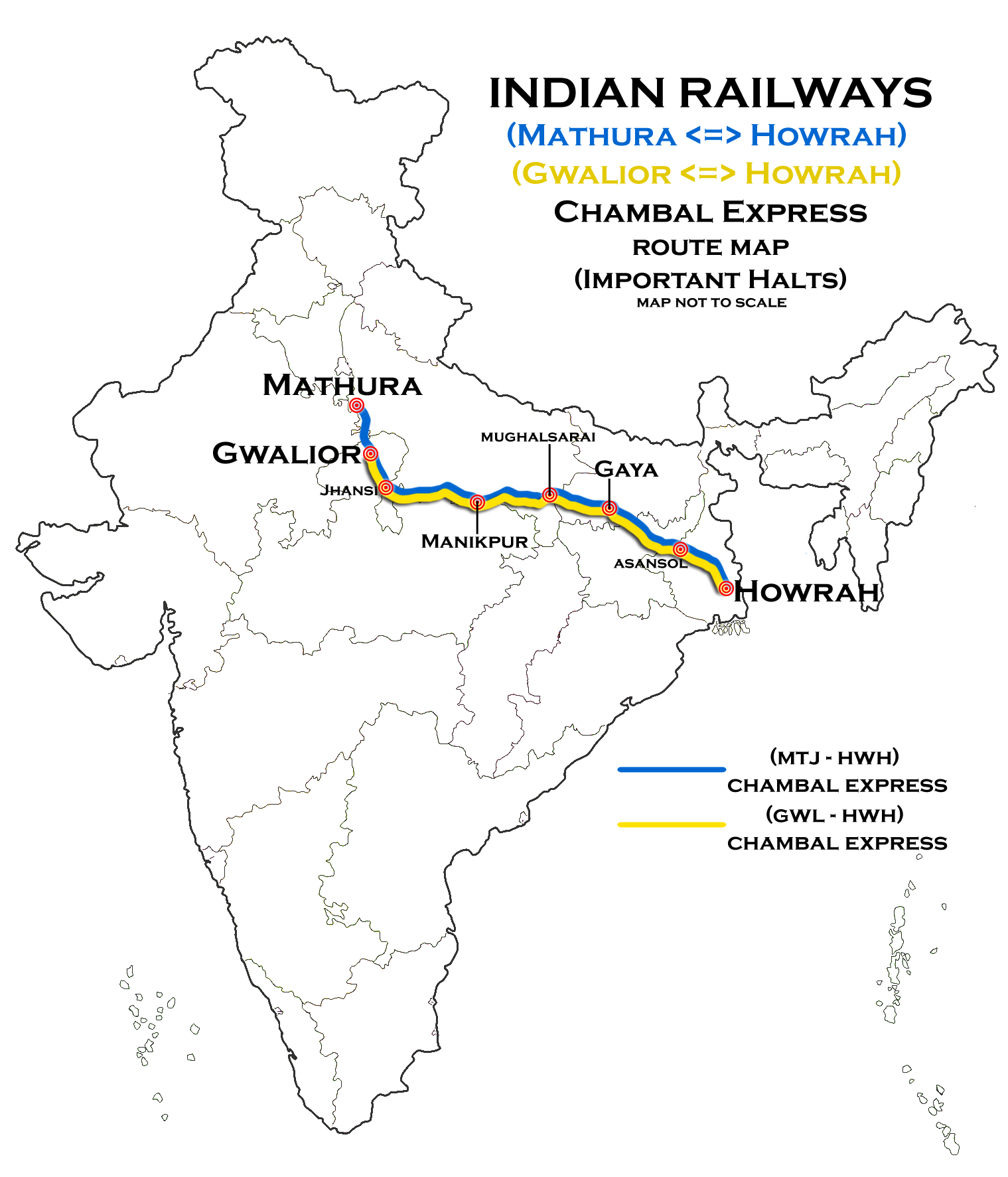

The 12175 / 12176 Howrah–Gwalior Chambal Express is an express train of the Indian Railways connecting Howrah Junction in West Bengal and Gwalior Junction of Madhya Pradesh. It is currently being operated with 12175/12176 train numbers three days a week.

== Service ==
The 12175 Howrah–Gwalior Chambal Express has an average speed of 55 km/h and covers 1288 km in 23 hrs 30 mins. 12176 Gwalior-Howrah Chambal Express has an average speed of 55 km/h and covers 1288 km in 23 hrs 30 mins.

== Route & halts ==
The important halts of the train are:

- Howrah
- Bardhaman
- Durgapur
- Asansol Junction
- Dhanbad Junction
- Netaji Subhas Chandra Bose Gomoh
- Parasnath
- Koderma Junction
- Gaya Junction
- Dehri-on-Sone
- Sasaram Junction
- Bhabua Road
- Mughalsarai Junction
- Chunar Junction
- Mirzapur
- Vindhyachal
- Cheoki Junction
- Manikpur Junction
- Banda
- Mahoba Junction
- Kulpahar
- Harpalpur
- Jhansi Junction
- Datia
- Dabra
- Gwalior

== Coach composition ==
The train has got LHB rakes from 12 January 2019 with max speed of 120 kmph. The train consists of 20 coaches:

- 1 AC I Tier
- 2 AC II Tier
- 4 AC III Tier
- 3 AC Economic Tier
- 10 sleeper coaches
- 4 general
- 1 second-class luggage/parcel van
- 1 PC

== Traction ==
Both trains are hauled by a Howrah Loco Shed-based WAP-7 electric locomotive on its entire journey.

== Rake sharing ==
The train shares its rake with 12177/12178 Howrah–Mathura Chambal Express.

== See also ==
- Howrah Junction railway station
- Gwalior Junction railway station
- Howrah–Mathura Chambal Express
