= Dabra railway station =

Railway station in Madhya Pradesh, India

Dabra
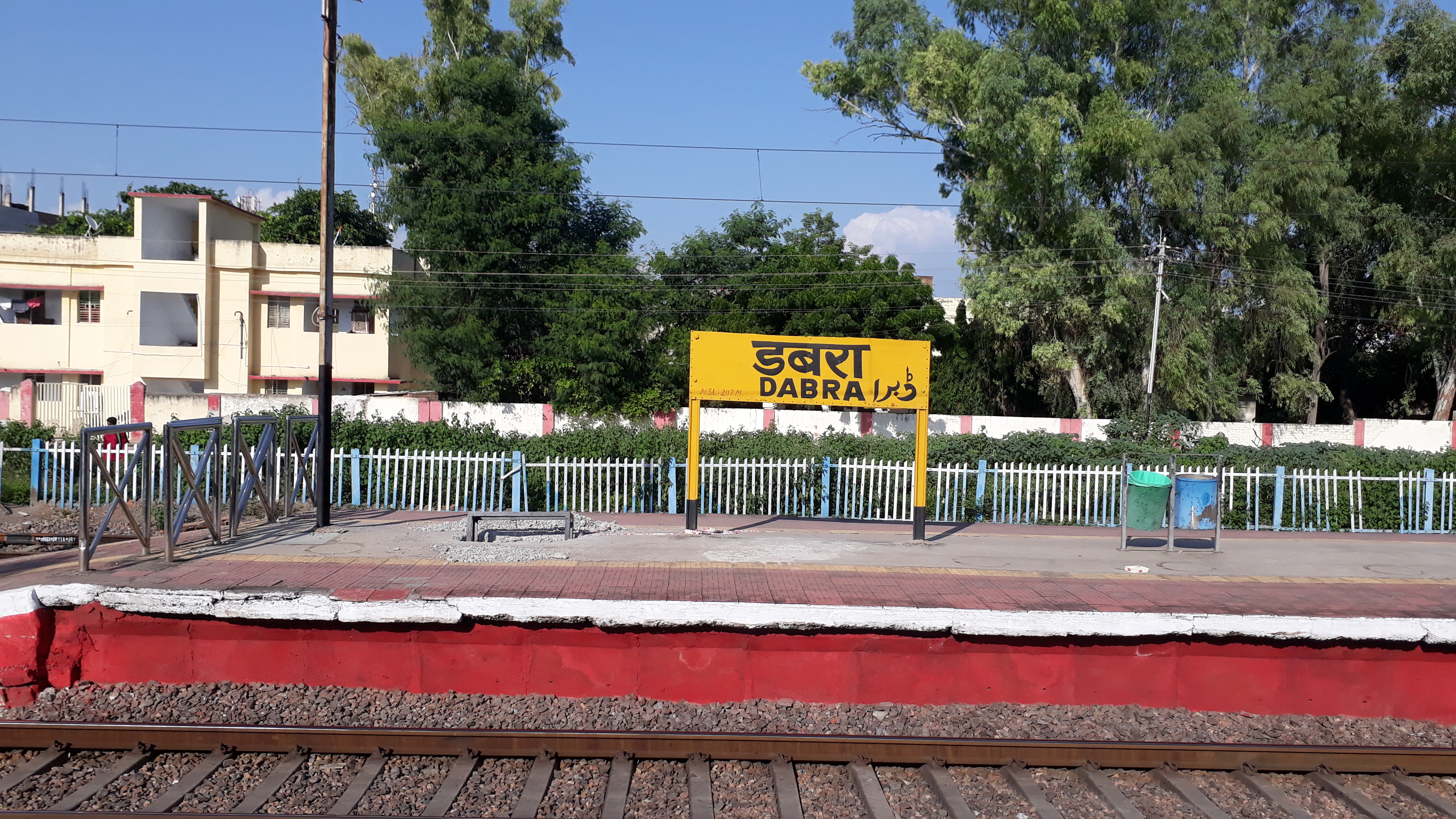

General information
- Location: Dabra, Gwalior district, Madhya Pradesh; India
- Coordinates: 25°52′54″N 78°19′50″E
- Elevation: 207 metres (679 ft)
- System: Indian Railways station
- Owner: Indian Railways
- Operator: North Central Railway
- Line: Agra–Bhopal section
- Platforms: 4
- Tracks: 7
- Connections: Auto stand

Construction
- Structure type: Standard (on-ground station)
- Parking: Yes

Other information
- Status: Functioning
- Station code: DBA
- Zone(s): North Central Railway
- Division(s): Jhansi
Location
- Location within India Location within Madhya Pradesh

Dabra railway station is a railway station in Gwalior district, Madhya Pradesh. Its station code is DBA. It serves around 5 lakh people of Dabra city, Pichhore Bhitarwar, Takenpur BSF Academy and other nearby towns and villages.

== Major trains ==
- Malwa Express
- Lashkar Express
- Patalkot Express
- Mahakoshal Express
- Chhattisgarh Express
- Khajuraho–Udaipur City Express
- Patalkot Express
- Bundelkhand Express
- Jhelum Express
- Kalinga Utkal Express
- Panchvalley Passenger
- Barauni–Gwalior Mail
- Jhansi–Bandra Terminus Express
- Agra–Jhansi Passenger (unreserved)
- Chambal Express
- Punjab Mail
- Chambal Express
- Taj Express
- Sachkhand Express
- Gondwana Express
- Jhansi–Etawah Link Express
- Jhansi–Bandra Terminus Express
- Jhansi–Etawah Link Express
- Jhansi–Indore Link Express
- Dakshin Express
