= Dongargarh =

- Town
- Dongargarh
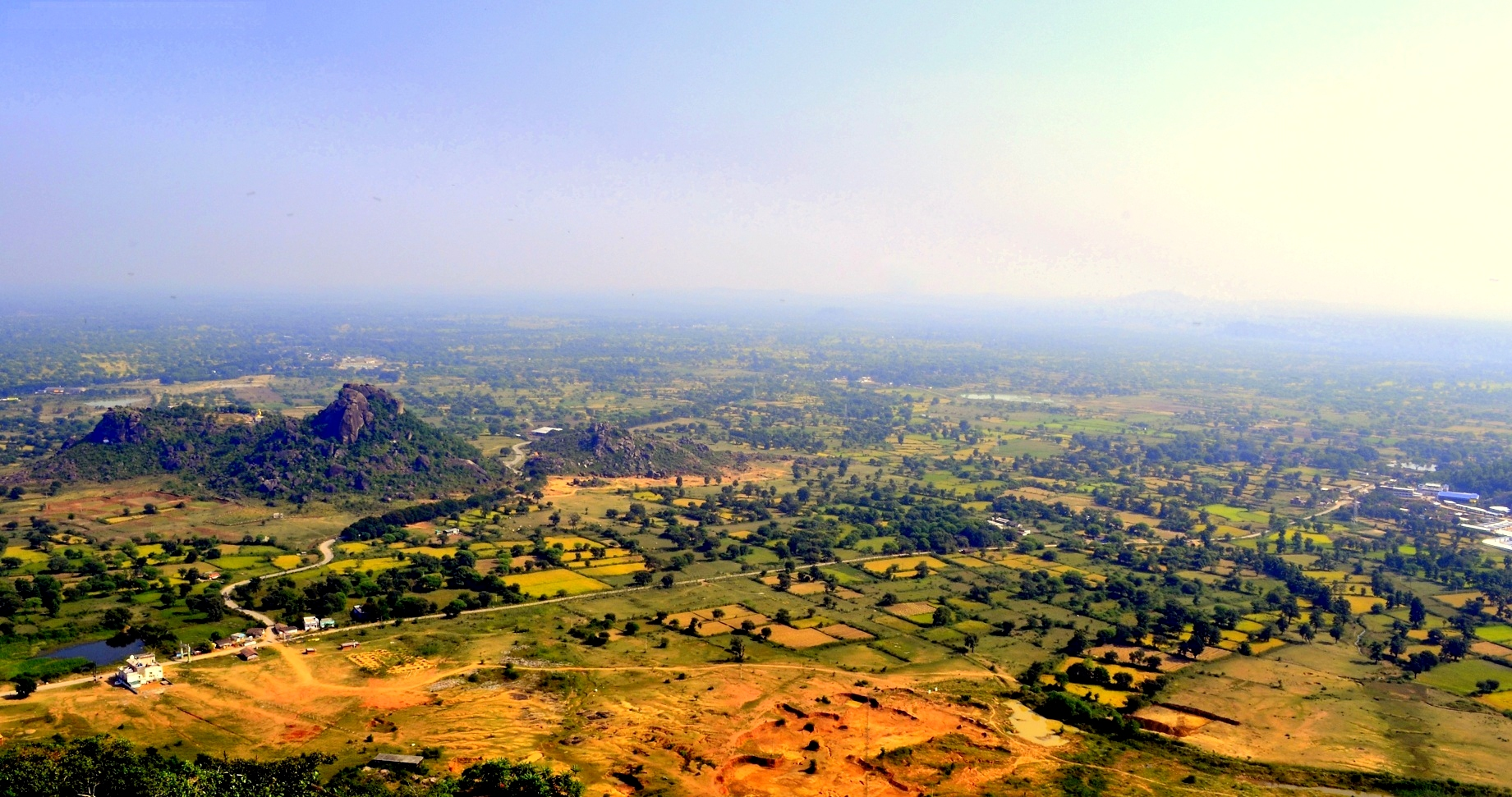
- From top, left to right: Maa Bamleshwari dongargarh, Early morning view of town from temple on a hilltop, Downhill Temple in Dongargarh, Bamleshwari Talab, Dongargarh, Dongargarh Railway station, Aerial view of town
- Nickname: Dharma Nagari
- Location in Chhattisgarh, India Dongargarh (India)
- Coordinates: 21.188712°N 80.759072°E
- Country: India
- State: Chhattisgarh
- District: Rajnandgaon

Government
  - Type: Mayor
  - Body: Municipal Council

Area
  - Total: 17 km^{2} (6.6 sq mi)

Population (2011)
  - Total: 37,372
  - Density: 2,200/km^{2} (5,700/sq mi)

Languages
  - Official: Hindi, Chhattisgarhi
- Time zone: UTC+5:30 (IST)
- PIN: 491445
- Vehicle registration: CG-08

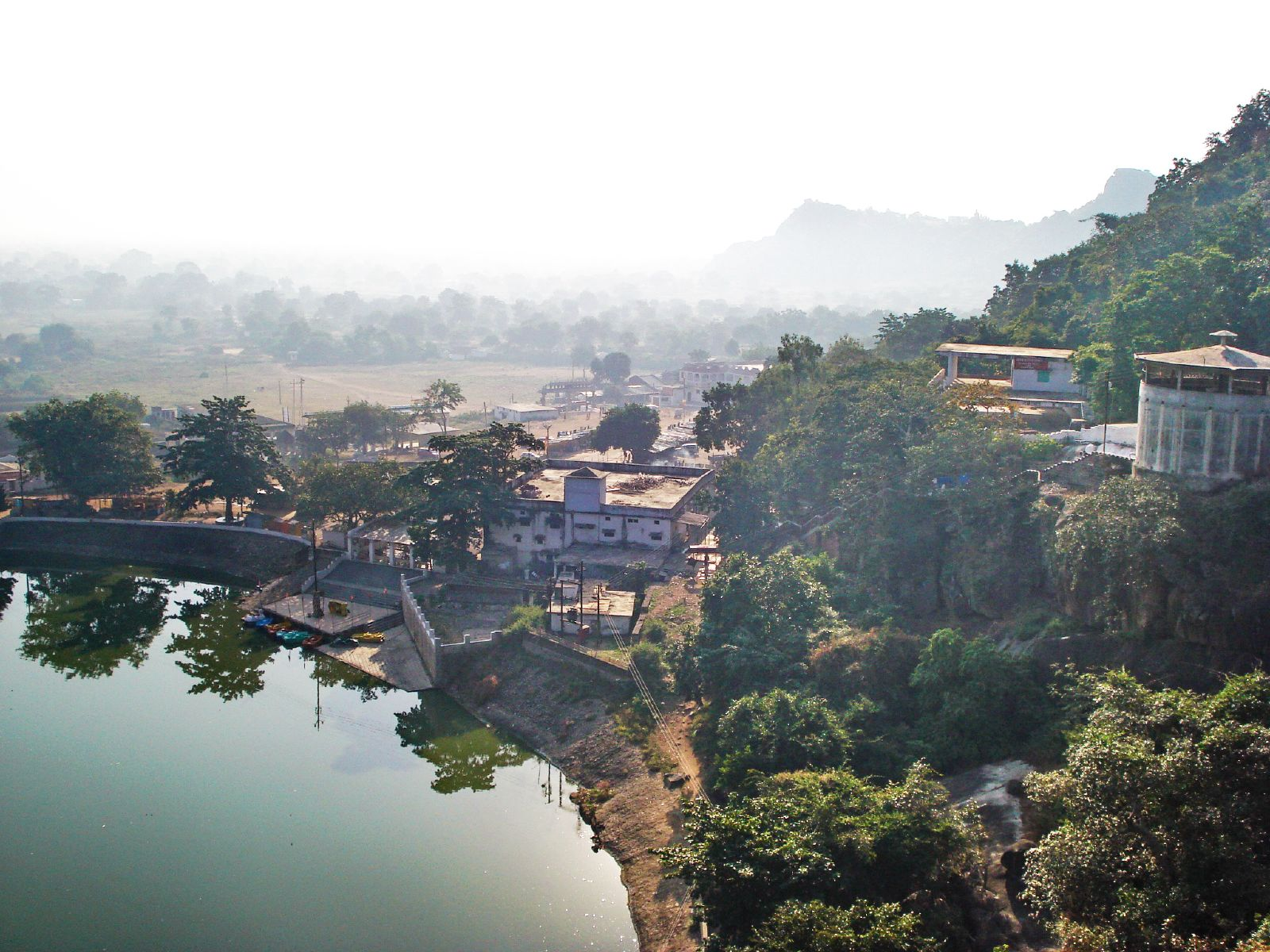
Tapsi Lake

Dongargarh is a town and municipality in Rajnandgaon District in the state of Chhattisgarh, India and the site of the Bambleshwari Temple and Chandragiri Jain Temple. A prominent pilgrim destination in Rajnandgaon District, the city lies about 35 kilometres (22 mi) west from Rajnandgaon, 67 kilometres (42 mi) west from Durg and 132 kilometres (82 mi) east from Bhandara which are situated on National Highway 6. Featuring majestic mountains and ponds, Dongargarh is derived from the words: Dongarh meaning 'mountains' and garh meaning 'fort'.

The Maa Bamleshwari Devi Temple, situated on a 1,600 feet (490 m) high hilltop, is a popular landmark. It is of great spiritual importance and several legends are associated with this shrine too. Another prominent shrine in the vicinity is Chhoti Bamleshwari Temple. Devotees flock these temples during Navratri. Shivji Temple and temples dedicated to Lord Hanuman are also located here. The ropeway is an added attraction and is the only passenger ropeway in Chhattisgarh. A severe accident occurred in 2016 when the ropeway broke and fell down killing several people.

The town is known for religious Harmony and has considerable population of Buddhists, Sikhs, Christians and Jains apart from Hindus.A 30 feet high statue of Budhha situated at the hilltop of the Pragyagiri hill is another attraction of the town. This is visible from the all the 06 major hills of the town. In addition to these, A Jain temple is also being constructed on a hill known as Chandragiri with the blessings of Jain saint Acharya Shri Vidyasagar Ji Maharaaj. The temple is specially recognized for an ancient statue of the Teerthankara god Chandraprabhuji. One of the biggest gurudwaras in the state is also located in the heart of the city managed by the Sikh society which also run Khalsa Public School, one of the biggest schools in the town. Dongargarhs oldest and most beautiful Roman Catholic church (Sacred Heart Church) is situated just near the railway station as well as there is a tall and beautiful Calvary hill near the railway colony which has a huge cross on the tip of the hill which can be seen from a far distance during the day. Every year a huge crowd of devotees Christians and other Religions gather here during the month of April for the way of the cross marking the Crucifixion of Jesus Christ as well as to get his blessings.

The nearest airport Swami Vivekanand Airport is at Raipur, 110 kilometres (68 mi) away while the nearest railhead is Dongargarh Railway Station. Dongargarh has good road communication and buses and taxis are available from Rajnandgaon.

== Demographics ==
As of the 2011 India census, Dongargarh had a population of 37,372 with males constituting 52% of the population and females 48%. The city's average literacy rate is 80%, which is higher than the national average of 59.5%; male literacy is 81% and, female literacy is 66%. In Dongragarh, 12% of the population is under 6 years of age.

== Transport ==
=== Railway ===
Dongargarh (DGG) is a atation on the Howrah–Nagpur–Mumbai line. It falls under Nagpur Division of South East Central Railway zone. It is situated 73.04 kilometres (45.38 mi) from Gondia & 63.76 kilometres (39.62 mi) from Durg.

=== Roadway ===
Dongargarh is connected by National Highway 553|NH553 which runs for 89.22 kilometres (55.44 mi) connecting Amgaon & Rajnandgaon. The city is also connected by National Highway 553A|NH553A which runs for 38.62 kilometres (24.00 mi) as a parallel highway to NH53 from Tumdiboda to Chichola. National Highway 553B|NH553B which runs for 37.50 kilometres (23.30 mi) also connects the city with Khairagarh on National Highway 130F|NH130F

== Education ==
- Jawahar Navodaya Vidyalaya (Only Navodaya school in Rajnandgaon District),
- Kendriya Vidyalaya (Central School (India))
- St. Vincent Palloti International Residential School
- Wesleyan English Med. Hr. Secondary School
- Khalsa Public School
- Govt.Boys & Girls Hr.School
- Saraswati shishu mandir, Hr. School
- St. Peter's convent, High. School

== Gallery ==
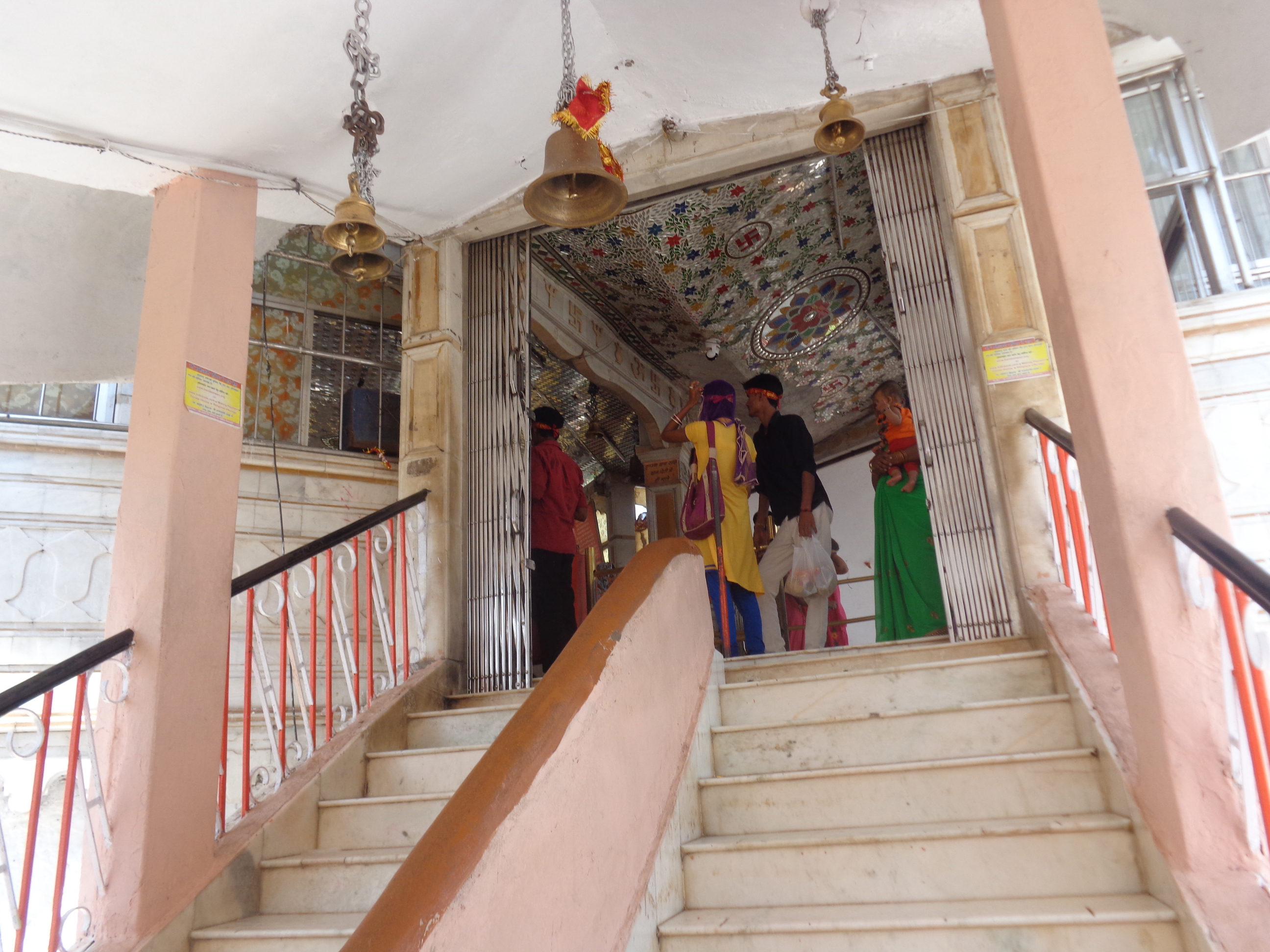
way to bambleshwari temple

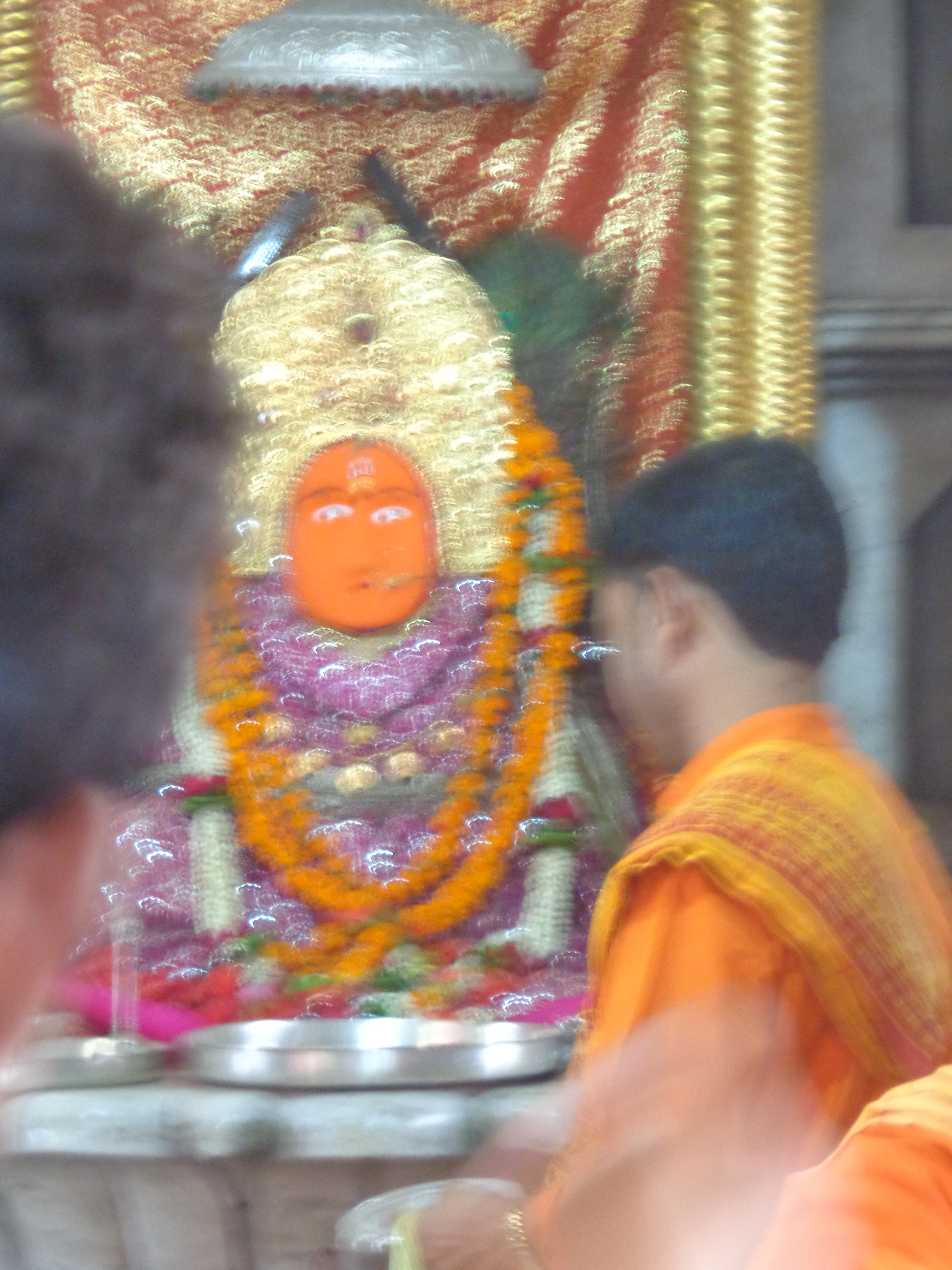
devi bambleshwari

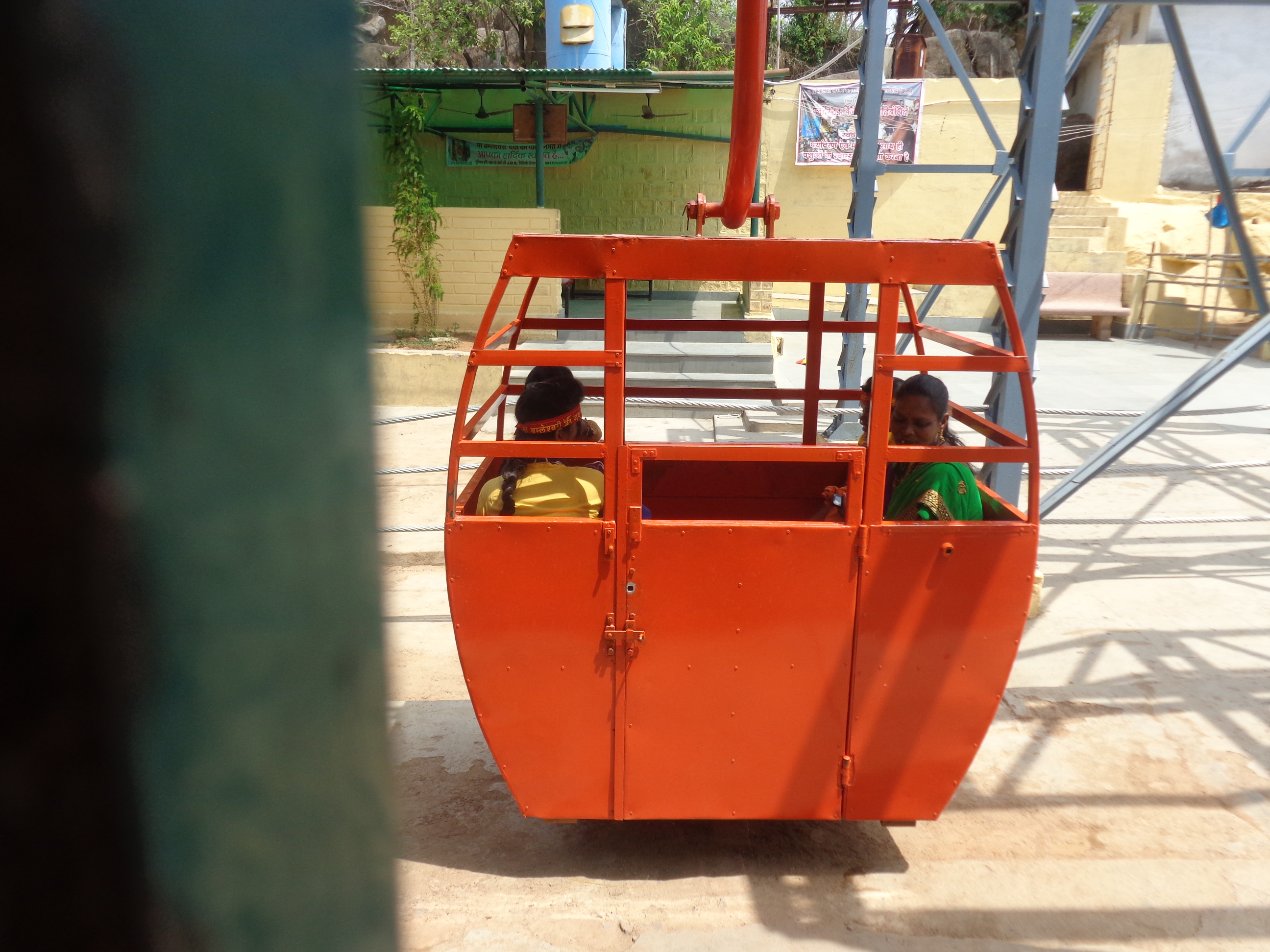
ropeway of dongargarh from bambleshwari temple

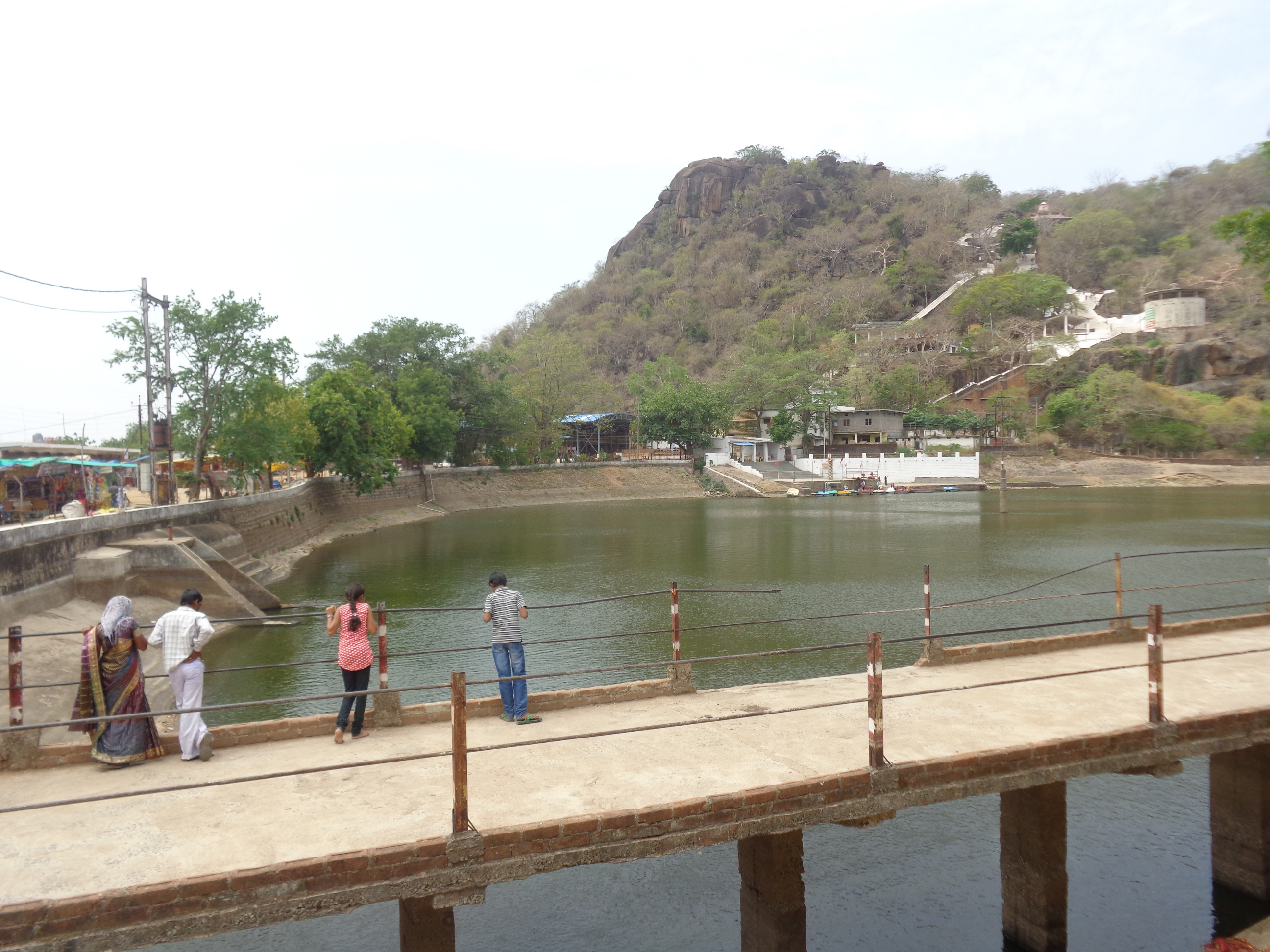
passage from dongargarh to bambleshwari temple

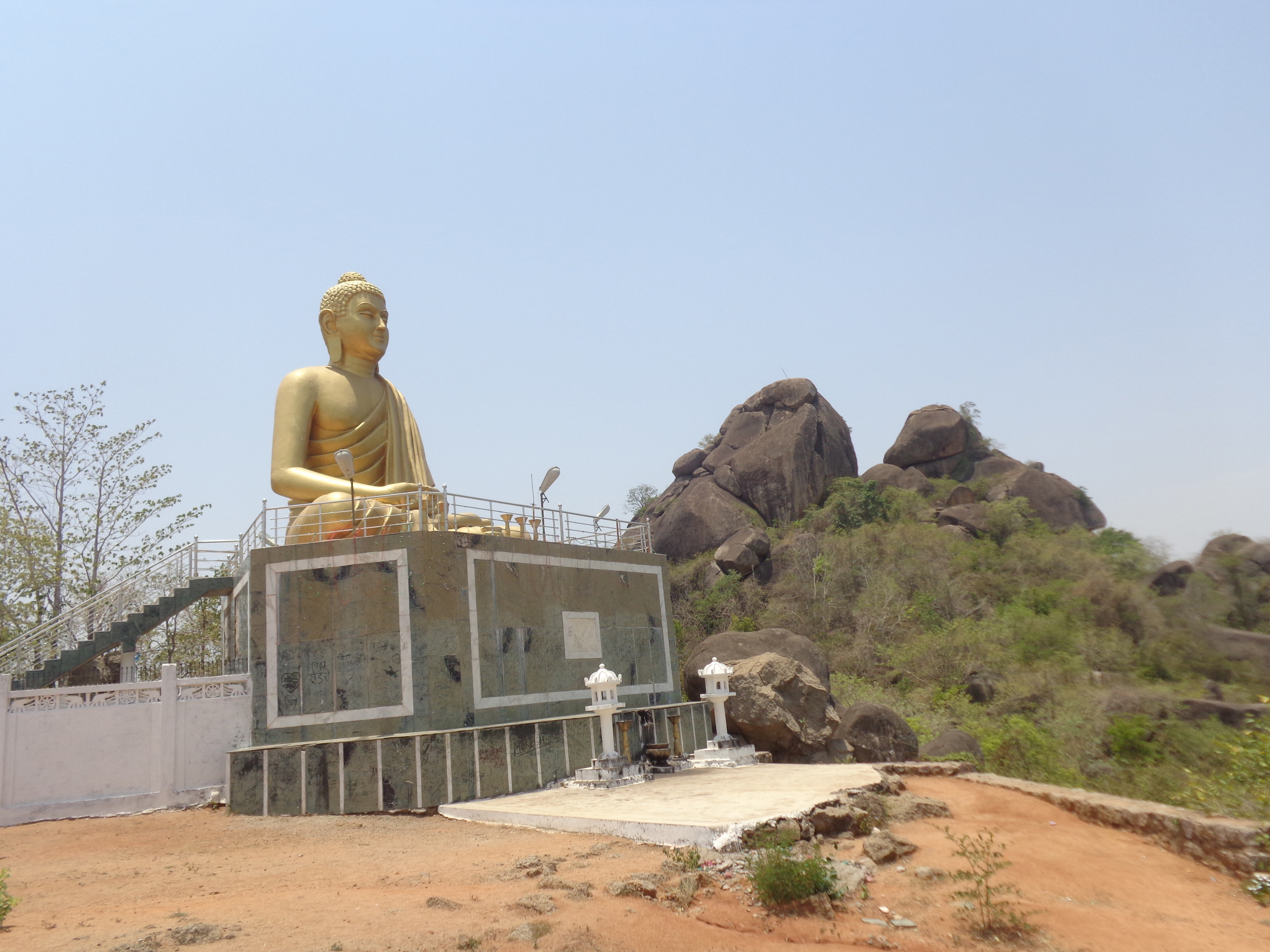
buddha statue at pragyagiri

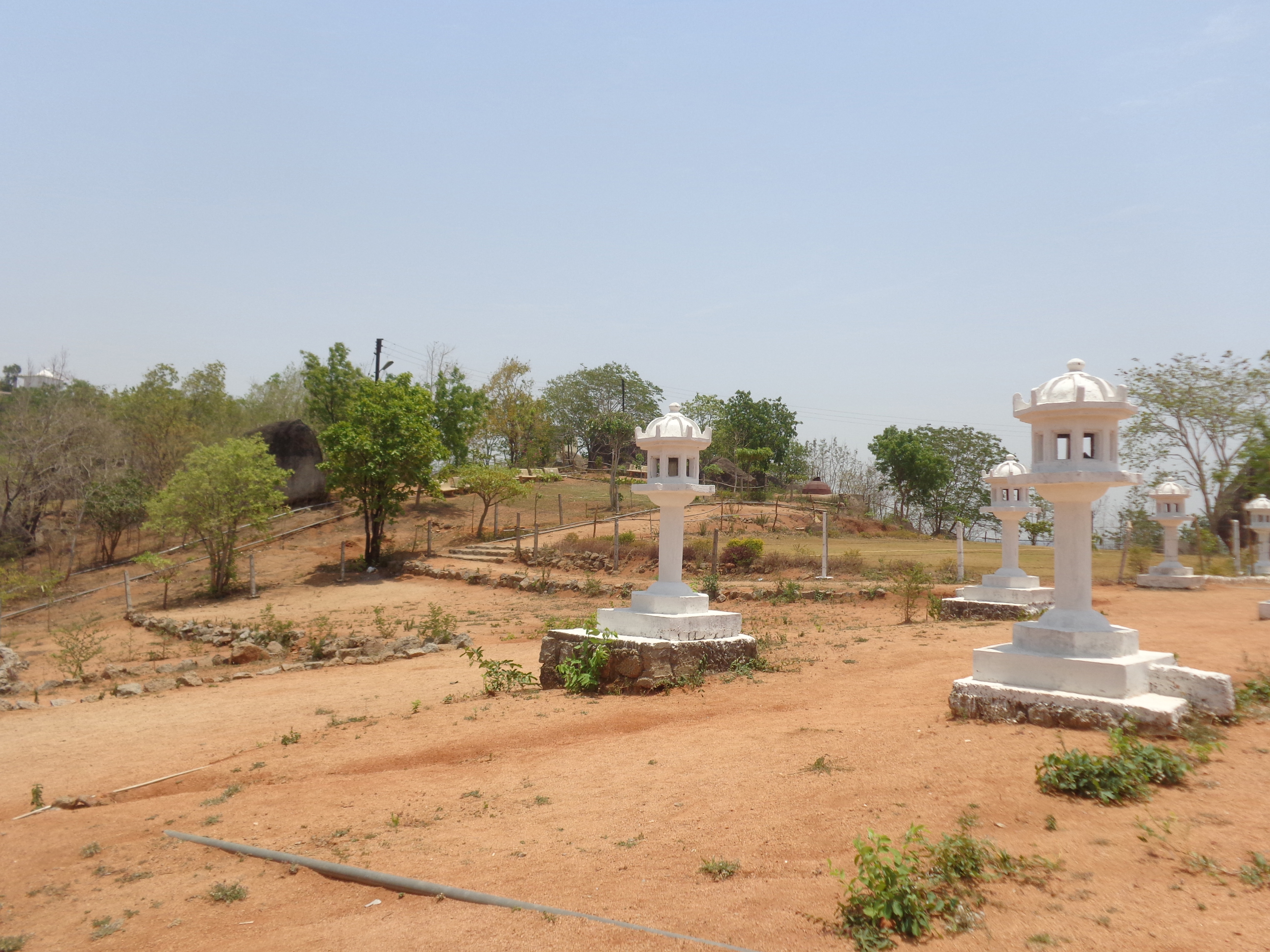
pragyagiri garden

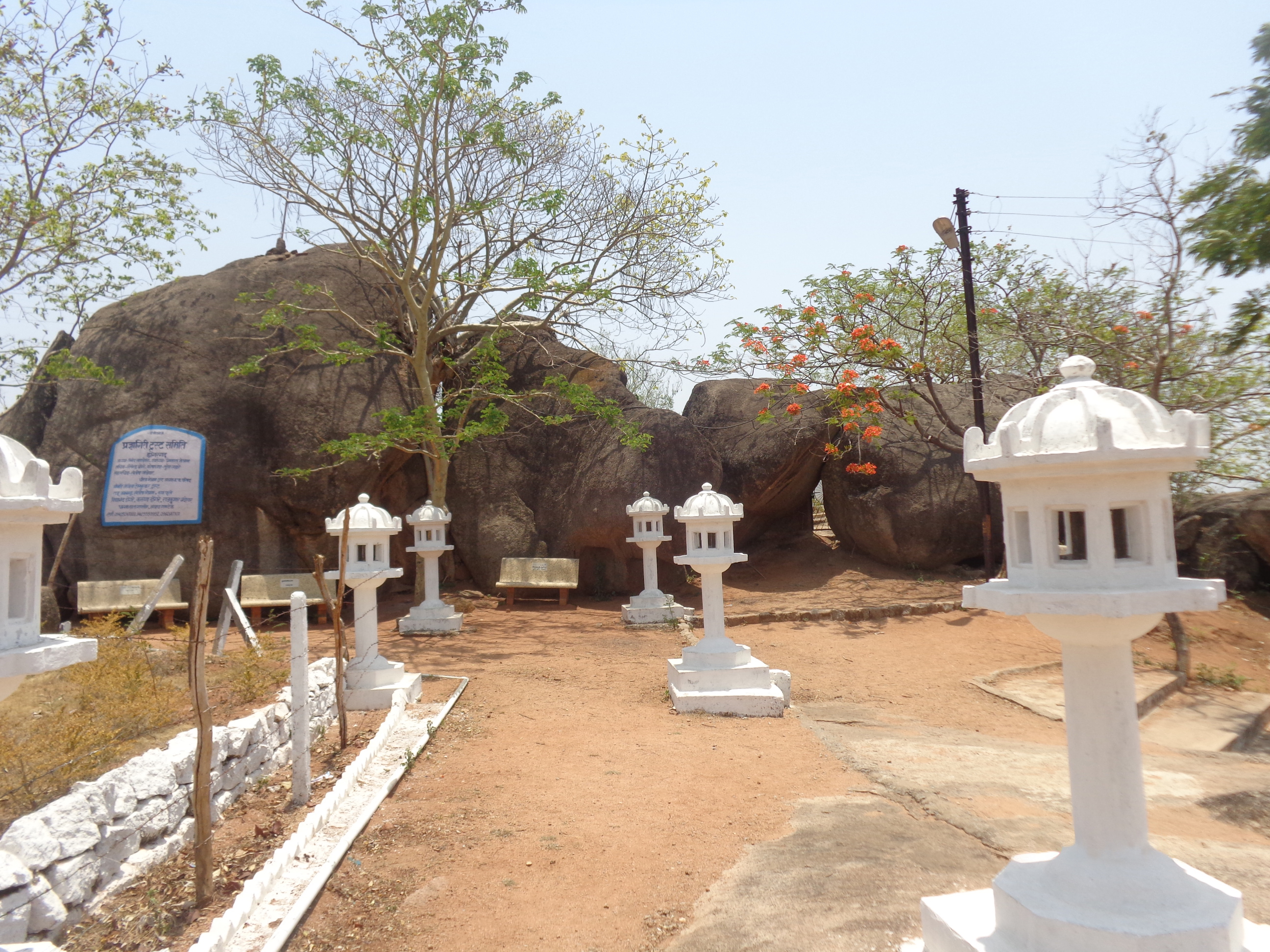
Rock pragyagiri

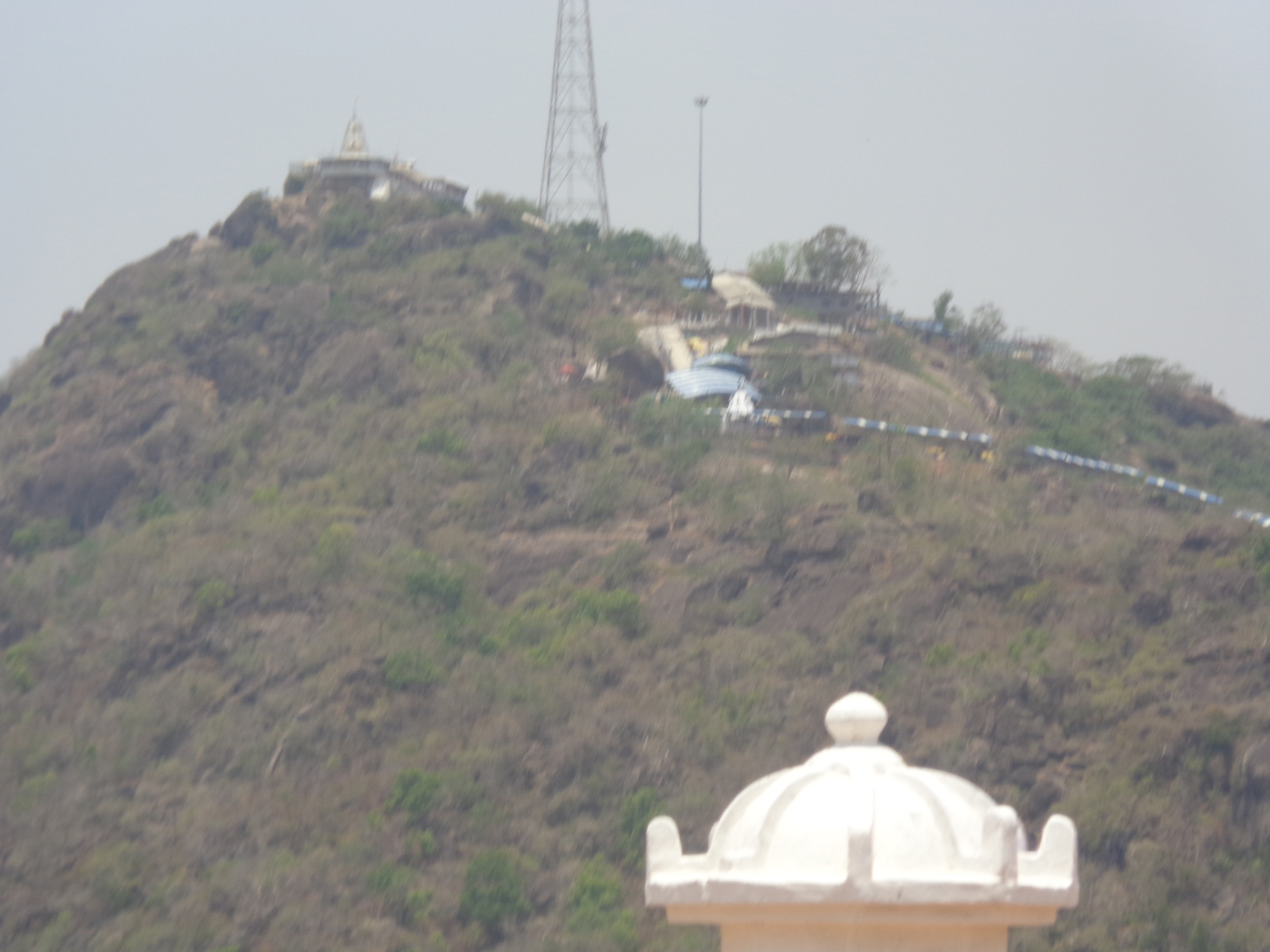
Sight of bamblesvari from pragyagiri

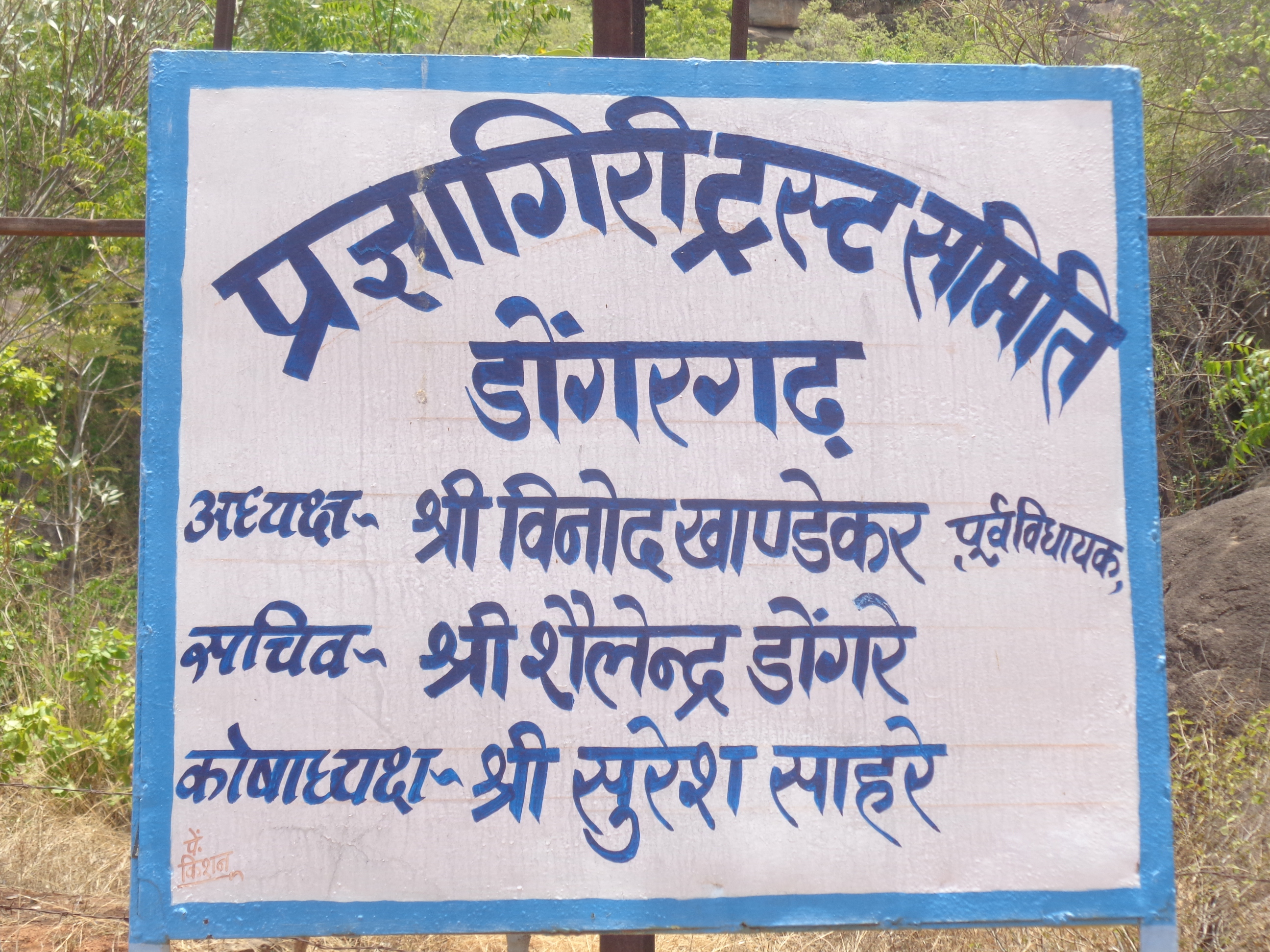
Detail pragyagiri

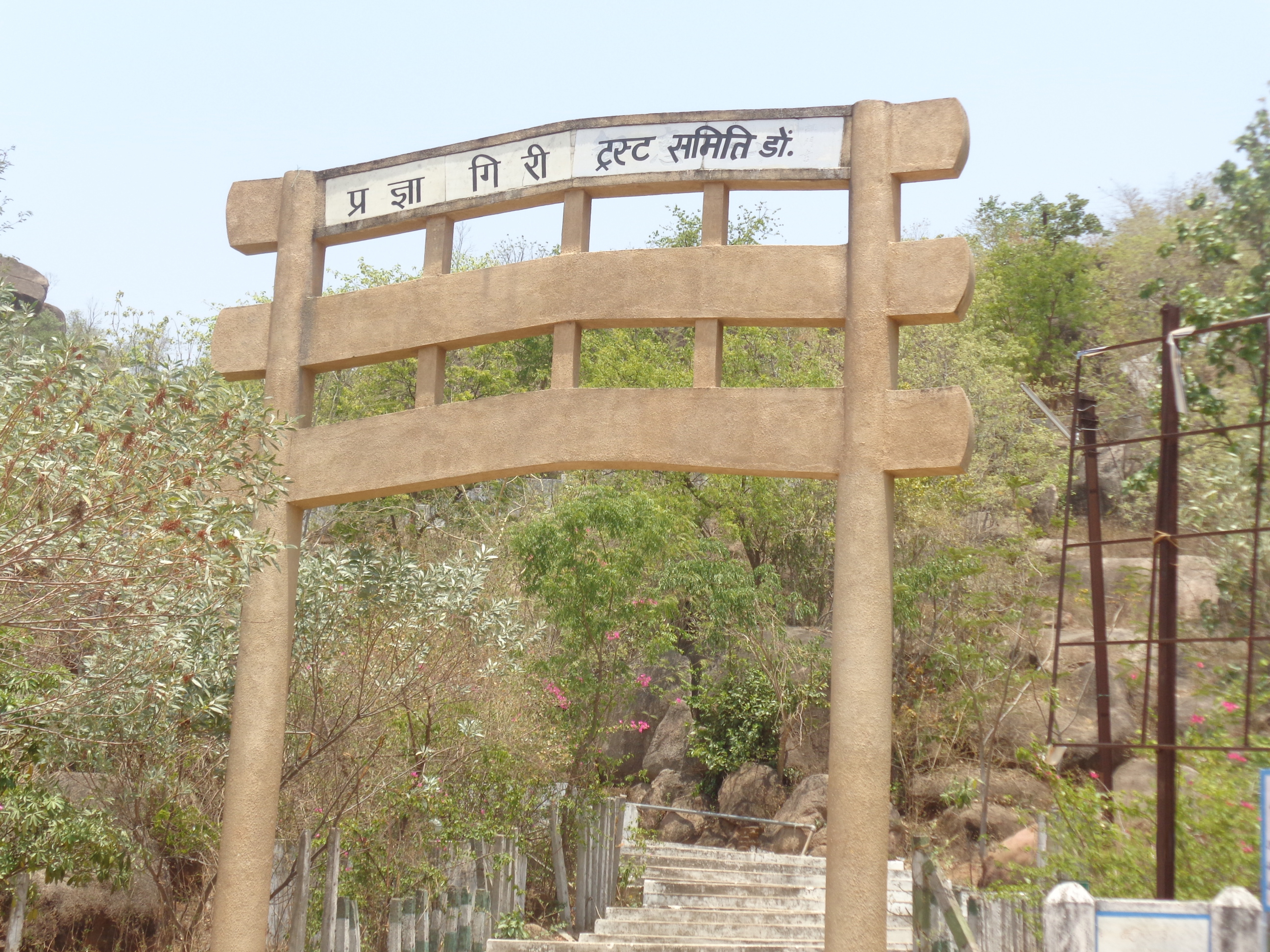
Entrance pragyagiri

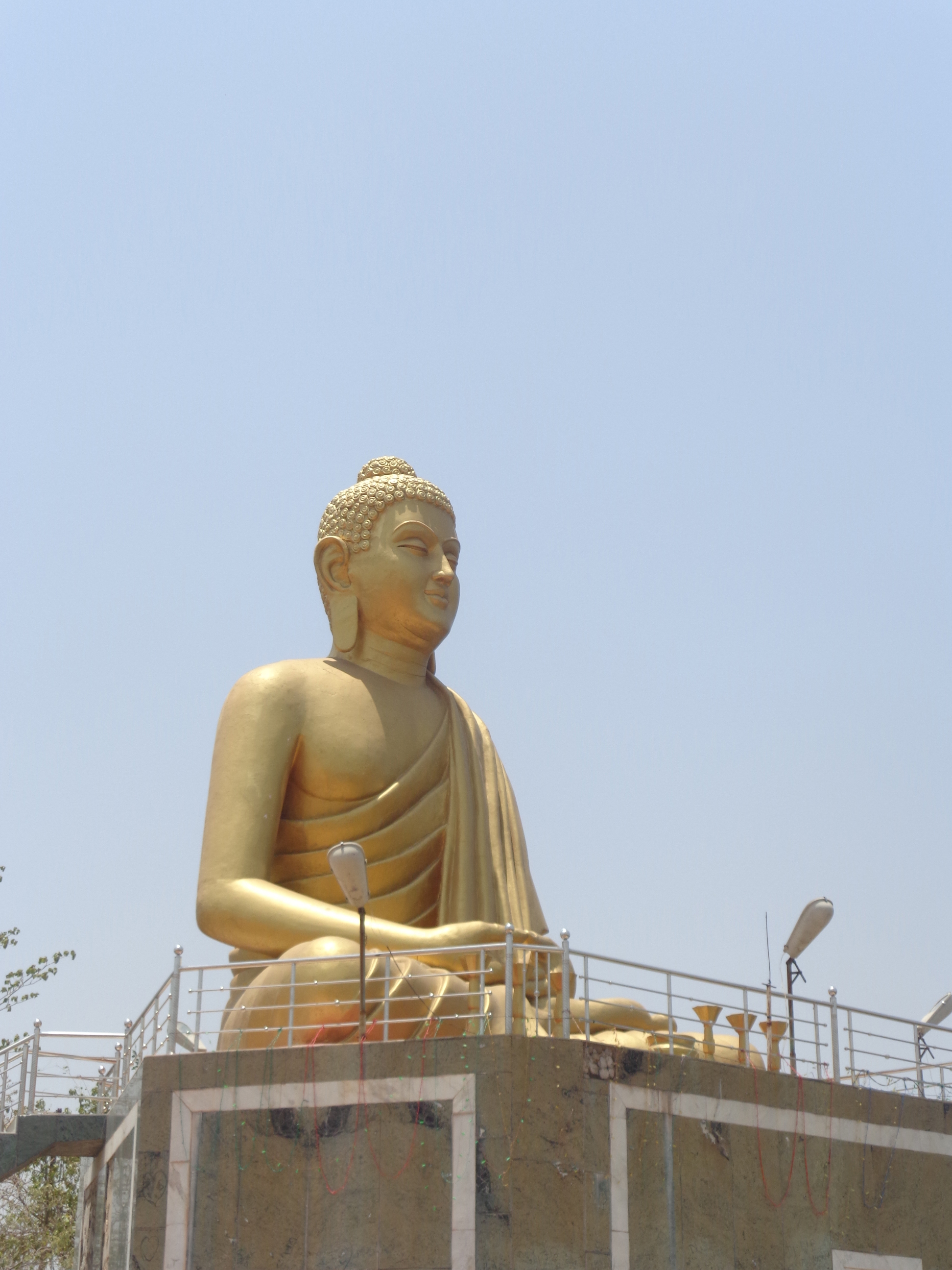
Buddha statue pragyagiri

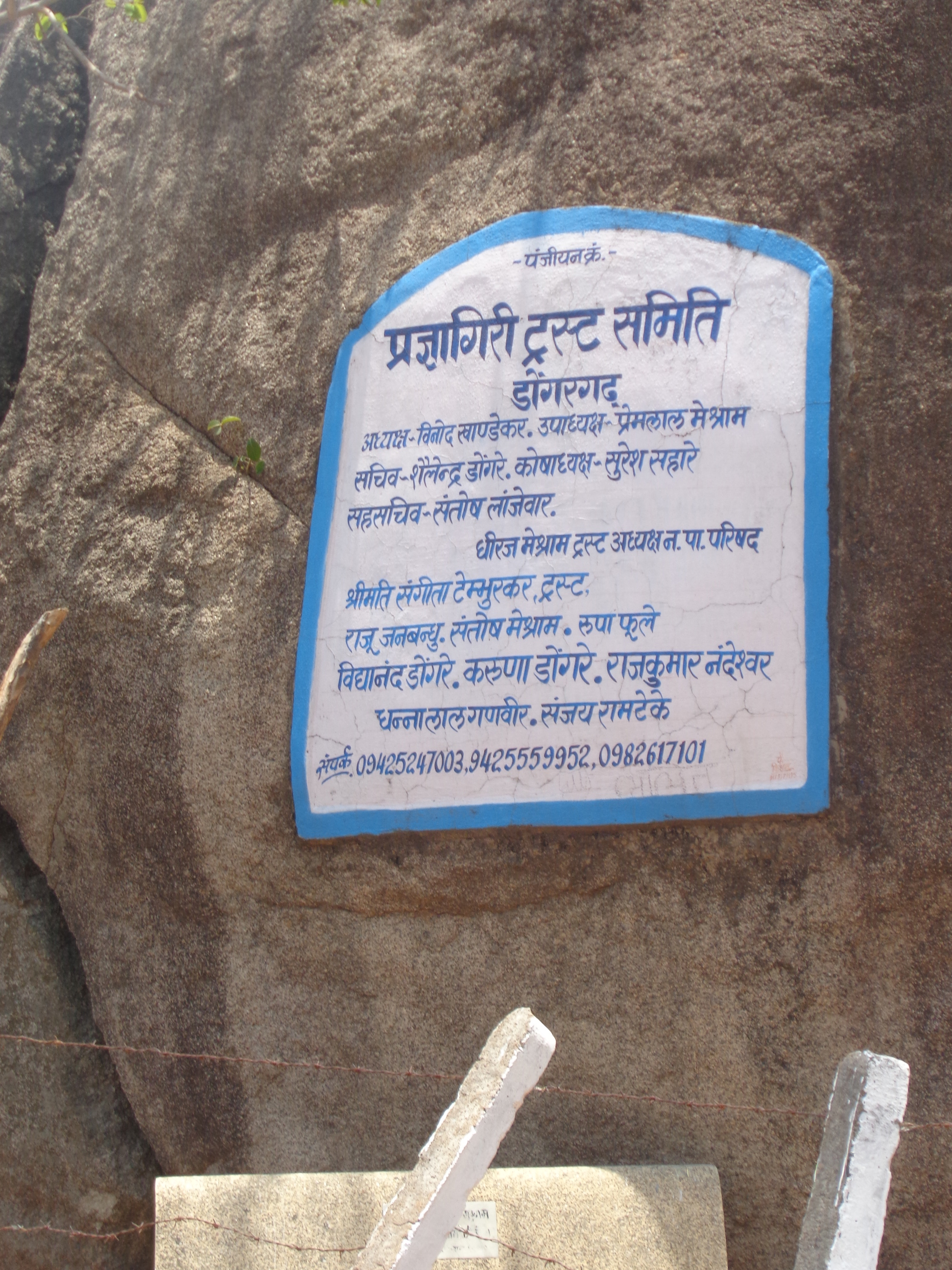
Notice pragyagiri

== See also ==
- Dongargaon, Chhattisgarh
