= Dr. B. R. Ambedkar University of Social Sciences =

State University in Madhya Pradesh

Coordinates: 22.541°N 75.739°E

Dr. B.R. Ambedkar University of Social Sciences
- Motto: "Atto Deepo Bhava" ("Be an island unto yourself" or "Be a light unto yourself")
- Type: Public
- Established: 2016
- Accreditation: UGC
- Vice-Chancellor: Dr. Ramdas Gomaji Atram
- Location: Mhow, Madhya Pradesh, India
- Website: brauss.mp.gov.in

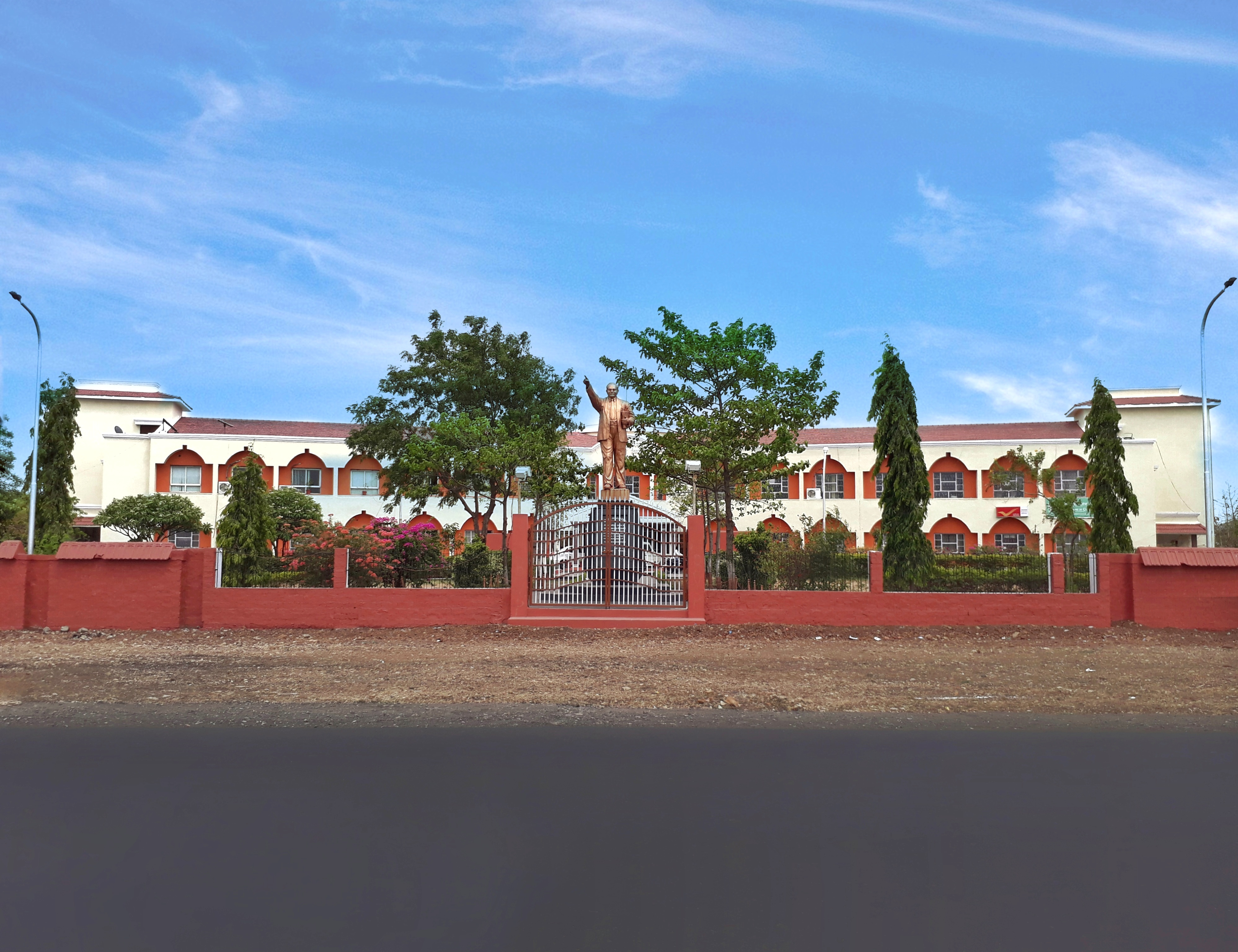
Dr. B.R. Ambedkar University of Social Sciences

Dr. B.R. Ambedkar University of Social Sciences (BRAUSS) is a state university located in Mhow, Madhya Pradesh, India. It was established in 2016 by the Government of Madhya Pradesh under the Dr. B.R. Ambedkar University of Social Sciences Act, 2015 to focus on education of social sciences, the first such university in India. The university is named after B. R. Ambedkar.
