= Dongargaon, Bhopal =

Dongargaon
- village
- Location within Madhya Pradesh Location within India
- Coordinates: 23.768030°N 77.221525°E
- Country: India
- State: Madhya Pradesh
- District: Bhopal
- Tehsil: Berasia

Population (2011)
  - Total: 638
- Time zone: UTC+5:30 (IST)
- ISO 3166 code: MP-IN
- Census code: 482064

Dongargaon is a village in the Bhopal district of Madhya Pradesh, India. It is located in the Berasia tehsil.

== Demographics ==
According to the 2011 census of India, Dongargaon has 142 households. The effective literacy rate (i.e. the literacy rate of population excluding children aged 6 and below) is 66.11%.

Demographics (2011 Census)
	Total	Male	Female
Population	638	332	306
Children aged below 6 years	101	46	55
Scheduled caste	124	65	59
Scheduled tribe	0	0	0
Literates	355	227	128
Workers (all)	326	177	149
Main workers (total)	147	134	13
Main workers: Cultivators	41	39	2
Main workers: Agricultural labourers	99	91	8
Main workers: Household industry workers	6	3	3
Main workers: Other	1	1	0
Marginal workers (total)	179	43	136
Marginal workers: Cultivators	7	5	2
Marginal workers: Agricultural labourers	169	37	132
Marginal workers: Household industry workers	1	1	0
Marginal workers: Others	2	0	2
Non-workers	312	155	157
