= Jhansi–Indore Link Express =

Overview
- Service type: Express
- Locale: Madhya Pradesh, Uttar Pradesh
- First service: September 1, 2016; 10 years ago
- Current operator: North Central Railways

Route
- Termini: Jhansi Junction; Indore Junction
- Stops: 11
- Distance travelled: 659 km (409 mi)
- Average journey time: 14 hours 30 minutes
- Service frequency: 4 days in a week
- Train number: 21801 / 21802

On-board services
- Classes: AC 2 Tier, AC 3 Tier, Sleeper class, General Unreserved
- Seating arrangements: Yes
- Sleeping arrangements: Yes
- Catering facilities: No pantry car attached
- Observation facilities: Rake sharing with 11125/11126 Indore–Gwalior Intercity Express & 11801/11802 Jhansi–Etawah Link Express

Technical
- Rolling stock: Standard Indian Railways coaches
- Track gauge: 1,676 mm (5 ft 6 in)
- Operating speed: 46 km/h (29 mph)

The 21801 / 02 Jhansi–Indore Link Express is an Express train of the Express/Mail series belonging to Indian Railways – North Central Railway zone that runs between Jhansi Junction and Indore Junction in India.

It operates as train number 21801 from Jhansi Junction to Indore Junction and as train number 21802 in the reverse direction, serving the states of Madhya Pradesh & Uttar Pradesh.

== Coaches ==
The 21801 / 02 Jhansi–Indore Link Express' has 1 AC 3 tier, 2 Sleeper class & 2 end-on generator coaches. It doesn't carry a pantry car.

As is customary with most train services in India, coach composition may be amended at the discretion of Indian Railways depending on demand.

== Service ==
The 21801 Jhansi–Indore Link Express covers the distance of 659 km (409 mi) in 14 hours 30 mins (45 km/h (28 mph)) & in 14 hours 00 mins as 21802 Indore–Jhansi Link Express (47 km/h (29 mph)).

As the average speed of the train is below 50.5 km/h (31 mph), as per Indian Railways rules, its fare doesn't includes a Superfast surcharge.

== Routing ==
The 21801 / 02 Jhansi–Indore Link Express runs from Jhansi Junction via Gwalior Junction, Shivpuri, Guna Junction, Maksi Junction, Ujjain Junction, Dewas Junction to Indore Junction.

== Traction ==
As the route is partially electrified, a WAG-7 electric loco from Jhansi Junction powers the train up to Gwalior Junction and then WDM-3A of Jhansi Junction based pulls the train up to its destination.

It also shares its rakes with 11125 / 11126 Indore–Gwalior Intercity Express & 11801 / 11802 Jhansi–Etawah Link Express
