= Datia railway station =

Railway station in Madhya Pradesh

Datia
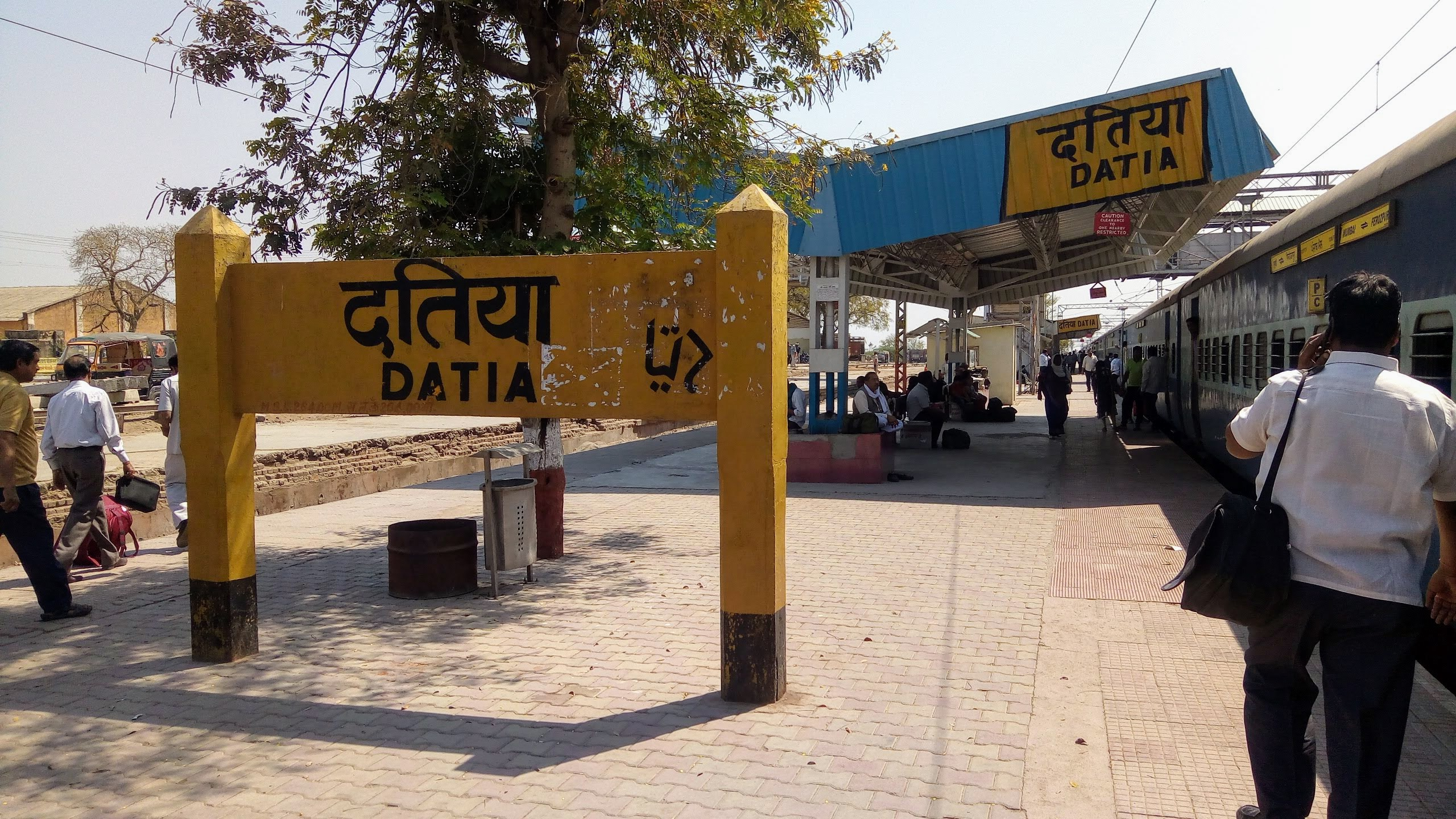
- Railway Station, Datia

General information
- Location: Datia, Datia district, Madhya Pradesh; India
- Coordinates: 25°38′26″N 78°27′22″E
- Elevation: 264 metres (866 ft)
- System: Indian Railways station
- Owner: Indian Railways
- Operator: North Central Railway
- Line: Agra–Bhopal section
- Platforms: 5
- Tracks: 9

Construction
- Structure type: Standard (on ground)
- Parking: Yes
- Cycle facilities: Yes

Other information
- Status: Functioning
- Station code: DAA
- Zone(s): North Central Railway
- Division(s): Jhansi
Location
- Location within India Location within Madhya Pradesh

Datia railway station is a railway station in Datia district, Madhya Pradesh, India. Its code is DAA. It serves the town of Datia. It is located on Gwalior-Jhansi mainline section. The station consists of five platforms. It contains various amenities such as drinking water rooms. Passenger, MEMU, Express, and Superfast trains stop at the station.

== Trains ==
The following trains stop at Datia railway station in both directions:

- Malwa Express
- Hazrat Nizamuddin–Khajuraho Vande Bharat Express
- Raigarh–Hazrat Nizamuddin Gondwana Express
- Mumbai CSMT–Amritsar Express
- Jabalpur–Hazrat Nizamuddin Express
- Mahakoshal Express
- Dakshin Express
- Jhansi–Bandra Terminus Express
- Kalinga Utkal Express
- Bundelkhand Express
- Hirakud Express
- Howrah–Gwalior Chambal Express
- Howrah–Mathura Chambal Express
- Punjab Mail
- Chhattisgarh Express
- Barauni–Gwalior Mail
- Taj Express
- Khajuraho–Udaipur City Express
- Jhelum Express
