= Dongargaon, Chhattisgarh =

Dongargaon
- Village
- Location in Chhattisgarh, India Dongargaon (India)
- Coordinates: 20.97°N 80.85°E
- Country: India
- State: Chhattisgarh
- District: Rajnandgaon

Government
  - Type: Municipal corporation
- Elevation: 304 m (997 ft)

Population (2021)
  - Total: 14,693

Languages
  - Official: Hindi, Chhattisgarhi
- Time zone: UTC+5:30 (IST)
- PIN: 491661
- Telephone code: 07745
- Vehicle registration: CG 08
- Sex ratio: 990 ♂/♀

Dongargaon is a town and municipality (Nagar panchayat) located within the Rajnandgaon district, within Chhattisgarh, India.

== Geography ==
Dongargaon is located at the coordinates 20.97°N 80.85°E. It has an average elevation of 304 metres (997 feet) above sea level.

== Demographics ==
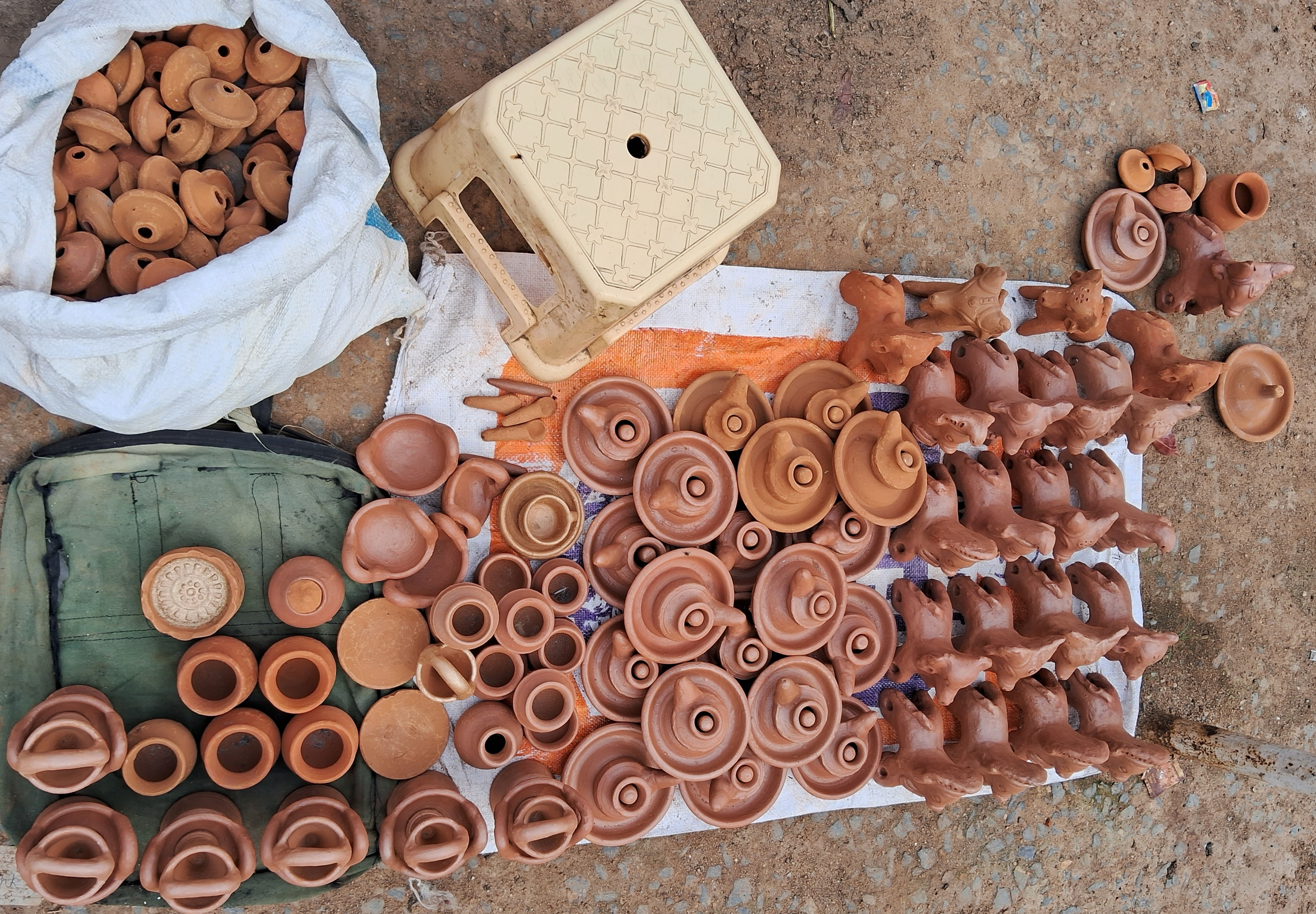
Traditional toys and other artworks for sale at Dongargaon

As of the 2001 India census, Dongargaon was recorded to have a population of 11,571 people. Males constituted 51% of the total population while females constituted 49%. Dongargaon has a literacy rate of 78%, which is higher than the overall national average of 74%. Within Dongargaon, 14% of the population is under the age of 6.

67% of the Dongargaon population work within the agricultural sector, 12% are employed by the government, 15% are employed by the private sector and 5% are employed by family-owned businesses.
