= Imperial Indian Mail =

Imperial railway in India

Overview
- Status: Discontinued in October 1939 until 1945; The regular mail service since 1945 is continuing via Gaya–Satna.
- Successor: 12321/12322 Mumbai Mail via Gaya–Satna
- Current operators: Great Indian Peninsula Railway, East Indian Railway

Route
- Termini: Howrah; Ballard Pier Mole railway station until 1939 (Now Mumbai CSMT since 1945)
- Stops: 50
- Distance travelled: 1343 miles or 2162 km
- Average journey time: 37 hours 45 minutes (towards Mumbai), 37 hours 45 minutes (towards Howrah)
- Service frequency: daily
- Line used: Howrah–Allahabad–Mumbai line

On-board services
- Classes: 1st class, with accommodation for servants
- Catering facilities: Restaurant car

Technical
- Track gauge: Broad gauge(1,676 mm (5 ft 6 in))

The Imperial Indian Mail was a passenger train running from Bombay to Calcutta. The train was a part of a maritime rail system that carried mail and passengers from London to Calcutta (and on to Rangoon) by a mix of ships and trains. Passengers traveled by train from London to Brindisi in Italy, then by boat from Brindisi to Bombay's Ballard Pier where they could directly board the Imperial Indian Mail for a 40-hour journey to Howrah. Passengers heading to Rangoon could transfer to a steamer after a short boat ride from the rail station at Howrah to the pier at Outram Ghat.

The train was featured in a 1939 film of the same title starring Noor Jehan. In Edward Morgan Forster's novel A Passage to India, the train that Mrs. Moore and Adela Quested took to get to Chandrapore was, most likely, the Imperial Indian Mail.

== History ==
In the 1890s, there was a single mail train operating between Bombay and Howrah running through Jabalpur and Allahabad (now Prayagraj). This train connected with several other mail trains at important stations along the route, providing a through connection to Bombay and also conveyed the English mail between the two cities. However the train was mainly intended for passenger traffic and it was not possible to expedite the delivery of the outbound mail to England, as the train's schedule was constrained by the connecting trains and passenger demands.

From 1897, the East Indian Railway and the Great Indian Peninsula Railway operated special trains to facilitate quick movement of the English mail from Bombay / Mumbai to Calcutta / Kolkata. The special trains connected directly with the mail steamers at Bombay and also carried a limited number of First Class passengers, completing the journey to Howrah in 43 hours. In 1908, the special train was replaced with a new service called the Overland Express. Similar services were operated to Madras and Peshawar.The Imperial Indian Mail was the best-known edition of these Postal special trains and commenced operations in November 1926.

== Operation ==
The Imperial Indian Mail was the name given to two trains, one operated by the East Indian Railway and the other by the Great Indian Peninsula Railway in connection with P&O. The weekly service departed from the Ballard Pier Mole railway station in Bombay on Fridays about 7 hours after the inbound steamer was signaled. As the steamer's schedule was unfixed, the train's time of departure was varied accordingly. In the return journey for the outbound mail and passengers, the train departed from Calcutta on Thursdays, reaching Bombay on Saturdays, pulling into Ballard Pier beside the outbound steamer. The time taken for the journey from Ballard Pier to Calcutta was 40 hours 13 minutes, and the return journey was completed in 37 hours 39 minutes.

The service commenced operations from November 1926 with the East Indian Railway's train departing from Howrah on 4 November 1926 and the Great Indian Peninsular Railway's train departing from Ballard Pier on 5 November 1926.

Due to the washing out of a bridge on the Narmada River between Itarsi and Jabalpur in September 1926, the service initially operated through a longer route, going through Bhopal, Bina and Katni till 31 May 1928, when a new bridge was opened and the train was rerouted through Jabalpur. For most of its operational service, it was the fastest train in the Indian subcontinent.

Unlike the regular mail train which called at Allahabad, the Imperial mail skipped Allahabad, going through Prayagraj Cheoki Junction railway station. A shuttle service was operated between Allahabad and Cheoki as a connecting train.

== Rolling stock ==
The service was the most luxurious service to operate in the Indian subcontinent with accommodation only for 32 First class passengers and their servants. The passengers were accommodated in 14 two berth and 4 single berth sleeping compartments. This service also marked the first time in India that bedding, cushions, blankets and other bedroom equipment were provided to the passengers. Hitherto, passengers had to carry their own valise and bedroom requirements.

The train operated by the East Indian Railway consisted of a mail van, two sleeping cars with 7 two berth compartments in each, a dining and parlor car, a sleeping, guard and luggage car and a car for the kitchen, servants, luggage and brake. Each carriage was painted blue and the interiors had a polished Teak finish. The single-berth passenger compartments and some of the two-berth compartments (those that had a lower and an upper berth) were provided with wardrobes and washstands.

The train operated by the Great Indian Peninsula Railway had a similar composition for the passenger coaches. However, the carriages were upholstered in blue leather with blue silk brocades for the windows. The exterior was painted olive grey with blue and gold moldings with the coat of arms of the Great Indian Peninsular Railway, the East Indian Railway and the P&O company emblazoned on the sides.

The train was hauled by the HPS class locomotives over the East Indian railway, and GIPR EA/1 class electric locomotives till Igatpuri on the Great Indian Peninsular railway.

== Current status ==
For all of its operational service, the Imperial Indian Mail operated alongside the daily Calcutta–Bombay mail, which had been in service ever since the opening of the rail link between Jabalpur and Allahabad. In October 1939, at the onset of World War II, the Imperial Mail was discontinued for an indefinite duration. The service was not resumed after the war until 1945. Since 1945, the regular mail service, is however still in operation and runs as the Howrah–Mumbai Mail (via Gaya–Jabalpur) numbered 12321/22 (3001 up/3002 down from 1945 since 2001). This train is still erroneously referred to as the Imperial Mail in most railway stations in its route.
