= Mumbai CSMT–Amritsar Express =

Train in India

Mumbai Chhatrapati Shivaji Maharaj Terminus–Amritsar Junction Express
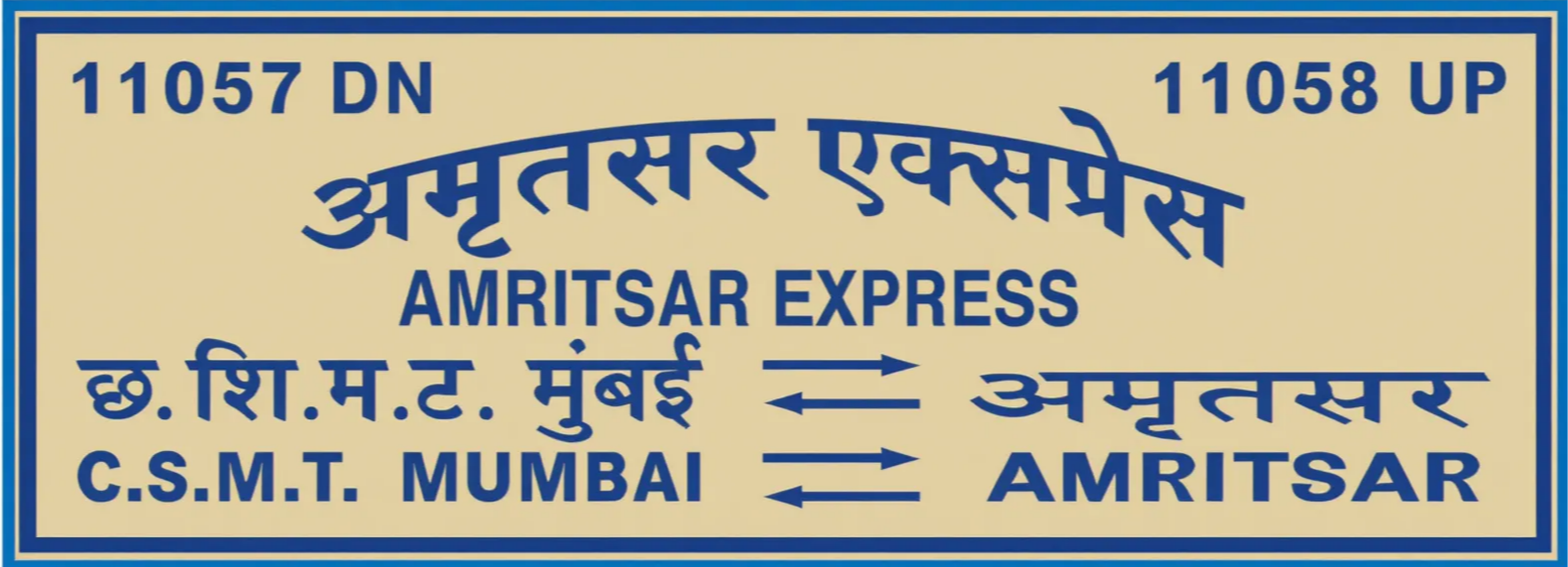

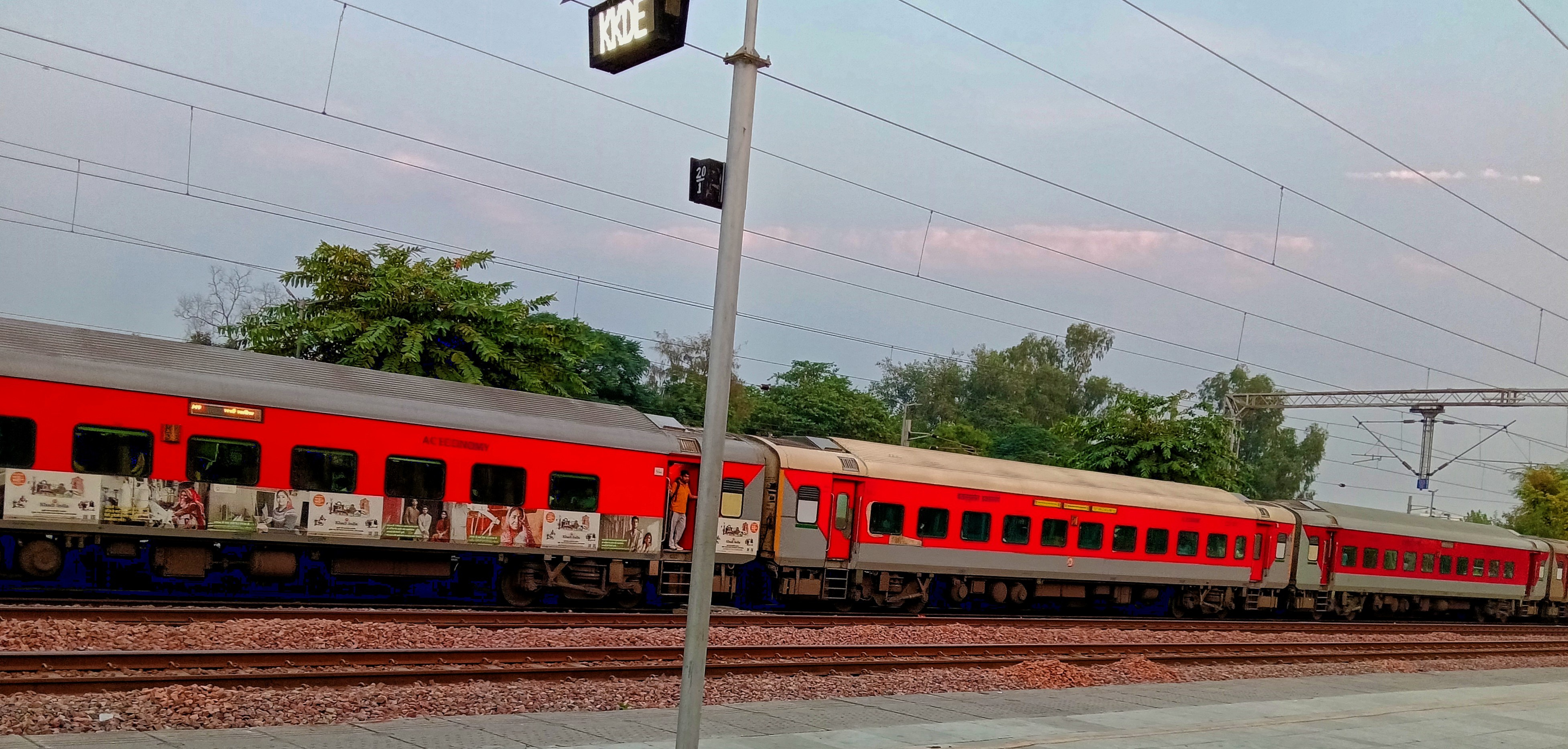
- Amritsar - Mumbai CSMT Express At Kurukshetra Junction railway station

Overview
- Service type: Express
- First service: 1 September 1919
- Current operator: Central Railway

Route
- Termini: Chhatrapati Shivaji Maharaj Terminus; Amritsar Junction
- Stops: 89 as 11057 Mumbai CSMT–Amritsar Express, 88 as 11058 Amritsar–Mumbai CSMT Express
- Distance travelled: 2,030 km (1,261 mi)
- Average journey time: 40 hours 45 minutes as 11057 Mumbai CSMT - Amritsar Express, 39 hours 15 minutes as 11058 Amritsar - Mumbai CSMT Express
- Service frequency: Daily
- Train number: 11057 / 11058

On-board services
- Classes: AC 2 tier, AC 3 tier, Sleeper Class, General Class
- Seating arrangements: Yes
- Sleeping arrangements: Yes
- Catering facilities: No pantry car attached

Technical
- Rolling stock: Standard Indian Railways ICF CBC Rake
- Track gauge: 1,676 mm (5 ft 6 in)
- Operating speed: 110 km/h (68 mph) maximum 50 km/h (31 mph) including halts

The 11057 / 58 Mumbai Chhatrapati Shivaji Maharaj Terminus–Amritsar Junction Express is an Express train belonging to Indian Railways – Central Railway zone that runs between Chhatrapati Shivaji Maharaj Terminus and Amritsar Junction in India. It operates as train number 11057 from Chhatrapati Shivaji Maharaj Terminus to Amritsar Junction and as train number 11058 in the reverse direction, serving the states of Maharashtra, Madhya Pradesh, Uttar Pradesh, Rajasthan, Haryana, Delhi and Punjab.

It is one of three trains that connect Mumbai and Amritsar, the other trains being the 12903 / 04 Golden Temple Mail & 12925 / 26 Paschim Express. However the 12903 / 04 Golden Temple Mail and 12925 / 26 Paschim Express are operated by Western Railway and have a different routing.

Alongside the Punjab Mail, this train is one of the oldest trains running out of Bombay. The train shares it's rakes, with 22159 / 22160, Mumbai CSMT-Chennai Express

== History ==
1905 was the year when Agra got direct connection to Delhi via Mathura Chord. Legendary Punjab Mail was diverted via Chord and Kashi Express was introduced as an Bombay Express train between Bombay and Delhi from 1 February 1907, numbered 27 Down (towards Delhi) and 30 Up (towards Bombay). For the first few years of its run, it only carried third class carriages and was popularly known as the Delhi Express.

From 1 September 1919, Delhi Express diverted to Allahabad & GUP Express commenced to connect Bombay to Delhi carrying passengers of all classes and with dining car. Through carriage to Lucknow was also added to the consist. This through carriage was detached at Jhansi, whence it was run through to Lucknow with a connecting train.

During this period, the Punjab Mail used to depart from Bombay shortly after noon and arrive at Delhi on the next night. This made it very inconvenient for conveying mail between Bombay and Delhi, as the mail had to be posted early at Bombay and detained overnight at Delhi. The Delhi express however, departed from Bombay late night and arrived at Delhi on the morning of the third day. This schedule was better suited for the mail service and consequently, from 1 January 1921, the Delhi express started carrying mail between Bombay and Delhi.

Between 1926 and 1930, due to the introduction of many new trains like the Frontier Mail and the Howrah–Lahore express, the Delhi express changed terminals several times. From 1 January 1926, the train started running through to Rawalpindi, over the tracks of the North Western railway. From 1 September of the same year, the run was extended to Peshawar, in competition to the BB&CIR's Frontier Mail which was also made into a regular train from the same day. The service was curtailed to Lahore from 1 September 1929 and extended back to Peshawar from 1 March 1930. Subsequently, the train was designated as 197 Down and 198 Up on the GIPR's tracks.

Between September 1929 and March 1930, it used to carry the Mettupalayam–Lahore through carriages between Itarsi and Lahore. These carriages were run between Madras and Itarsi as the Grand Trunk Express.

Like many trains operating in North India, this train's services were disrupted during the partition of India in 1947. After several temporary alterations in its route and schedule, from 12 January 1948, it resumed regular operations between Bombay and Delhi. Later the same year, its run was extended to Amritsar.

Starting from the early 1950s, it started running through to Pathankot and was called the Pathankot Express, a name that is still used at many wayside stations today. From 1 April 1968, the train started terminating at Amritsar again. Since then, barring changes in terminals within Bombay (the train operated from all major terminals in the Central Railway's jurisdiction in Bombay), the train's route and destination have remained unchanged.

== Coaches ==
The 11057 / 58 Mumbai Chhatrapati Shivaji Maharaj Terminus–Amritsar Junction Express presently has 1 AC 2 tier, 4 AC 3 tier, 8 Sleeper Class, 2 General Unreserved, 1 Railway Mail Service coach and 2 SLR (Seating cum Luggage Rake) coaches. It does not have a pantry car.

0	1	2	3	4	5	6	7	8	9	10	11	12	13	14	15	16	17	18
ENG	SLR	GS	S8	S7	S6	S5	S4	S3	S2	S1	B4	B3	B2	B1	A1	RMS	GS	SLR

As is customary with most train services in India, coach composition may be amended at the discretion of Indian Railways depending on demand.

== Service ==
11057 Mumbai Chhatrapati Shivaji Maharaj Terminus–Amritsar Junction Express covers the distance of 2030 kilometres in 40 hours 45 mins (49.82 km/h) and in 43 hours 20 mins as 11058 Amritsar Junction–Mumbai Chhatrapati Shivaji Maharaj Terminus Express (46.85 km/h).

As the average speed of the train is below 55 km/h (34 mph), as per Indian Railways rules, its fare does not include a Superfast surcharge.

== Routing ==
The 11057 / 58 Mumbai Chhatrapati Shivaji Maharaj Terminus–Amritsar Junction Express runs from Chhatrapati Shivaji Maharaj Terminus via Kalyan Junction, Igatpuri, Manmad Junction, Bhusaval Junction, Itarsi Junction, Bhopal Junction, Jhansi Junction, Gwalior, Mathura Junction, New Delhi, Ambala Cantonment Junction, Ludhiana Junction, Phillaur Junction Jalandhar City Junction to Amritsar Junction. The train also has 4 coaches for Dhule city which are terminated from Chalisgaon Junction towards Dhule.

== Traction ==
Initially the train ran from Dadar Terminus and was later shifted to Lokmanya Tilak Terminus on 22 October 2012 as part of a plan to decongest Dadar Terminus. Later, from 1 June 2015, its terminal shifted to Chhatrapati Shivaji Maharaj Terminus.

Earlier a WCAM 3 would haul the train between Dadar Terminus / Lokmanya Tilak Terminus until Igatpuri, handing over to a Ghaziabad-based WAP-4 which would haul the train until Ambala Cantonment Junction after which a Tughlakabad-based WDM-3A would power the train for the remainder of the journey.

With Central Railways progressively moving towards a complete changeover from DC to AC traction, it is now hauled by a Ghaziabad-based WAP-4, WAP-5 or a WAP-7 until Ambala Cantonment Junction after which a Tughlakabad-based WDM-3A or WDP-3A powers the train for the remainder of the journey.

After 1 June 2015 it shifts to Chhatrapati Shivaji Maharaj Terminus for changing the Patliputra Express (previously Rajendranagar Express) to Lokmanya Tilak Terminus.

== Timings ==
11057 Mumbai CSMT - Amritsar Express leaves Mumbai CSMT Everyday at 11:30PM to reach Amritsar on evening 04:15PM of Day 3 with a distance of 2047 km and an average speed of 50km/h with a total journey time of 40 hours 45 minutes.

11058 Amritsar - Mumbai CSMT Express leaves Amritsar Everyday at 08:50AM to reach Mumbai CSMT at Midnight 12:05AM on Day 3 with a distance of 2047 km and an average speed of 52km/h with a total journey time of 39 hours 15 minutes.

11057 Amritsar Express arrival at Rani Kamalapati railway station

== Rake sharing ==
It shares its rakes with 22159/22160 Mumbai CSMT–Chennai Express.
