= Mumbai CSMT–Chennai Express =

Train of India

Mumbai CSMT–Chennai Central Express

Overview
- Service type: Superfast
- First service: 1 December 1921; 104 years ago
- Current operator: Central Railway

Route
- Termini: Mumbai CSMT (CSMT); MGR Chennai Central (MAS)
- Stops: 28
- Distance travelled: 1,284 km (798 mi)
- Average journey time: 23 hours 05 minutes
- Service frequency: Daily
- Train number: 22159 / 22160

On-board services
- Classes: AC first, AC 2 tier, AC 3 tier, Sleeper class, General unreserved
- Seating arrangements: Yes
- Sleeping arrangements: Yes
- Catering facilities: Available
- Observation facilities: Large windows
- Baggage facilities: Available

Technical
- Rolling stock: LHB coach
- Track gauge: 1,676 mm (5 ft 6 in)
- Operating speed: 130 km/h (81 mph) maximum, 58 km/h (36 mph) average including halts
Route map
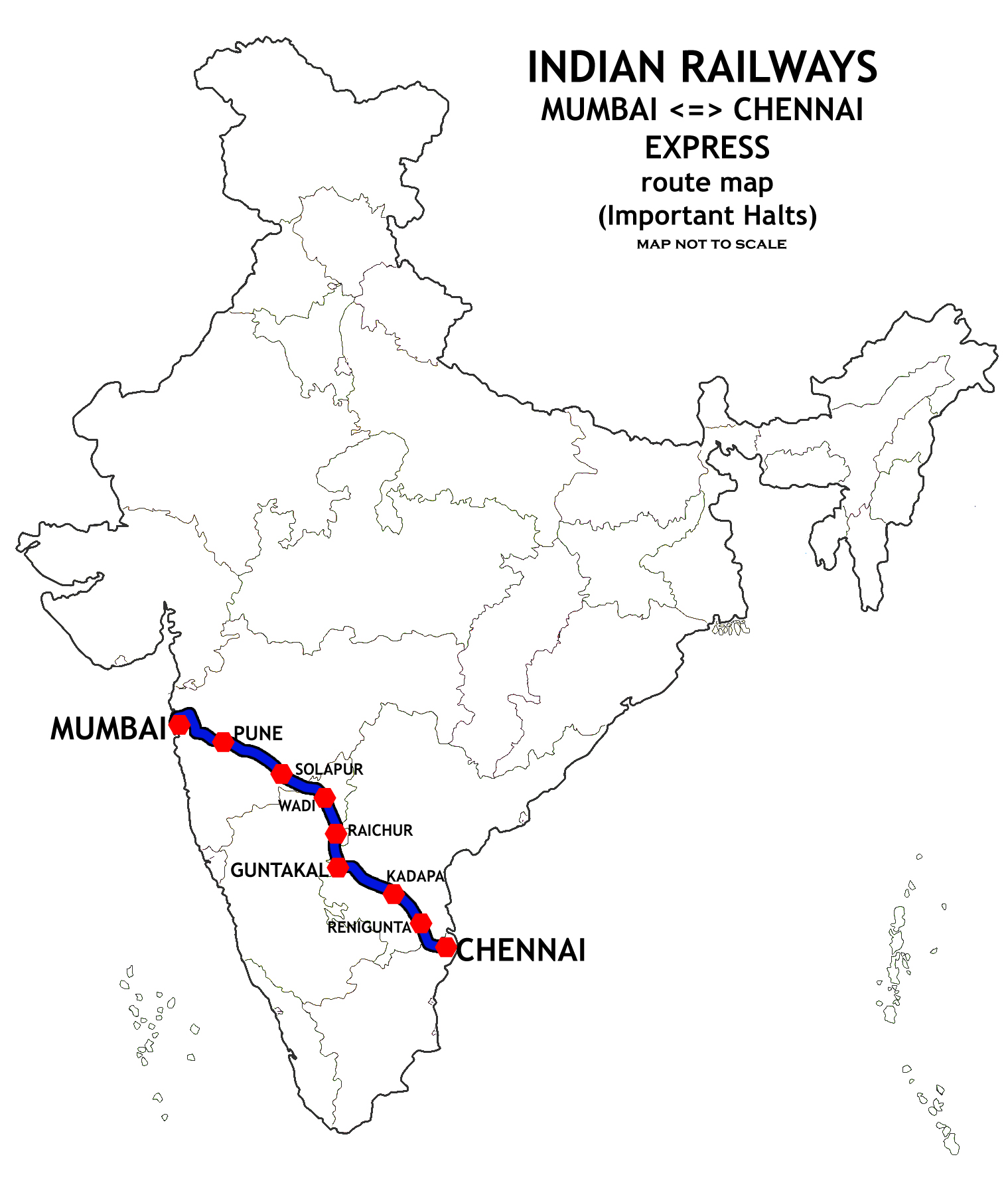
- Mumbai–Chennai Express/Mail train route map

The 22159 / 22160 Mumbai CSMT–Chennai Central SF Express is an Indian Railways train which travels between Chhatrapati Shivaji Maharaj Terminus, Mumbai and Puratchi Thalaivar Dr M.G. Ramachandran Central Railway Station, Chennai.

== History ==
The Bombay-Madras line was laid in stages between 1858 and 1871 by the Great Indian Peninsula Railway. This line is now known as the Mumbai–Chennai line.

The present Madras-Bombay Expresses were running as Madras-Bombay Fast passenger trains from 1 December 1921 to 28 February 1930. These trains were converted into Express trains with effect from 1 March 1930.

Before the train numbering change to five digits, it was known as 1041/1042. But after that the train number was converted to 11041/11042.

It was later converted into superfast express from 1 July 2020 and the train number was changed to 22159 for Mumbai–Chennai and 22160 for the Chennai–Mumbai instead of 11041/42.

The film Chennai Express takes place partially on this train.

== Route & halts ==
- Puratchi Thalaivar Dr. M.G. Ramachandran Central Railway Station
- Arakkonam Junction
- Tiruttani
- Puttur
- Renigunta Junction
- Koduru
- Razampeta
- Kadapa
- Yerraguntla Junction
- Tadipatri
- Gooty Junction
- Guntakal Junction
- Adoni
- Raichur
- Yadgir
- Wadi Junction
- Kalaburagi Junction
- Solapur
- Kurduvadi Junction
- Daund Junction
- Pune Junction
- Khadki
- Lonavala
- Kalyan Junction
- Dadar
- Chhatrapati Shivaji Maharaj Terminus

== Coach composition ==
The train consists of:

- 2 AC Two Tier
- 7 AC Three Tier Economy
- 2 Sleeper class
- 2 General Unreserved
- 1 Railway Mail Service coach
- 2 Seating cum Luggage Rakes

Loco	1	2	3	4	5	6	7	8	9	10	11	12	13	14	15	16	EoG	A1	A2	M1	M2	M3	M4	M5	M6	M7	S1	S2	GS	GS	RMS	-

== Traction ==
Since the route is fully electrified, Arakkonam or Royapuram -based WAP- 7 loco hauls the train from Mumbai CSMT to Chennai Central.

== Operation ==
It runs on a daily basis.

== Rake sharing ==
It shares its rakes with 11057/11058 Mumbai CSMT–Amritsar Express.

== Gallery ==
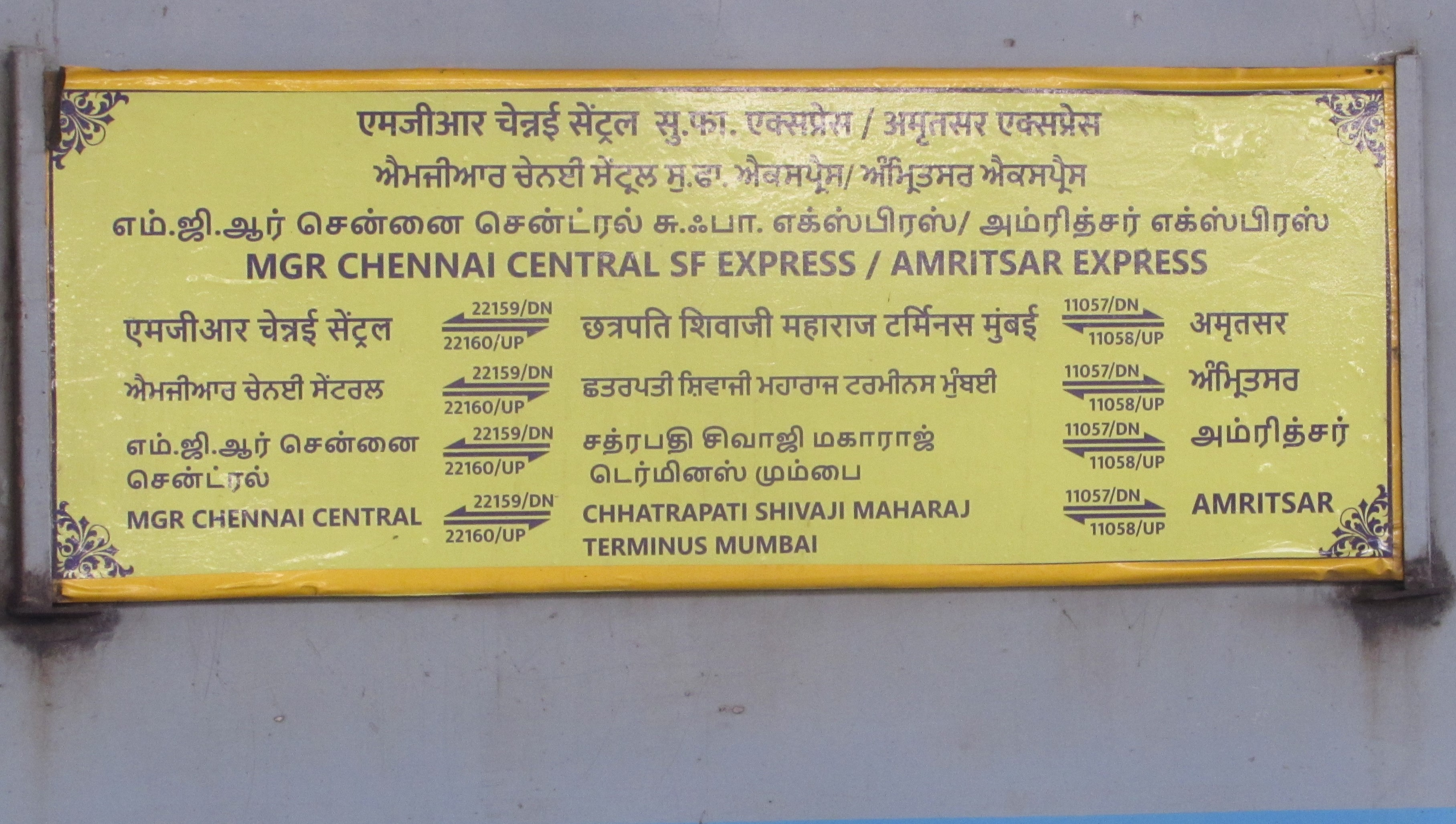
CSMT-MGR Express Board, also sharing its rake with 11057/11058 Mumbai CSMT–Amritsar Express

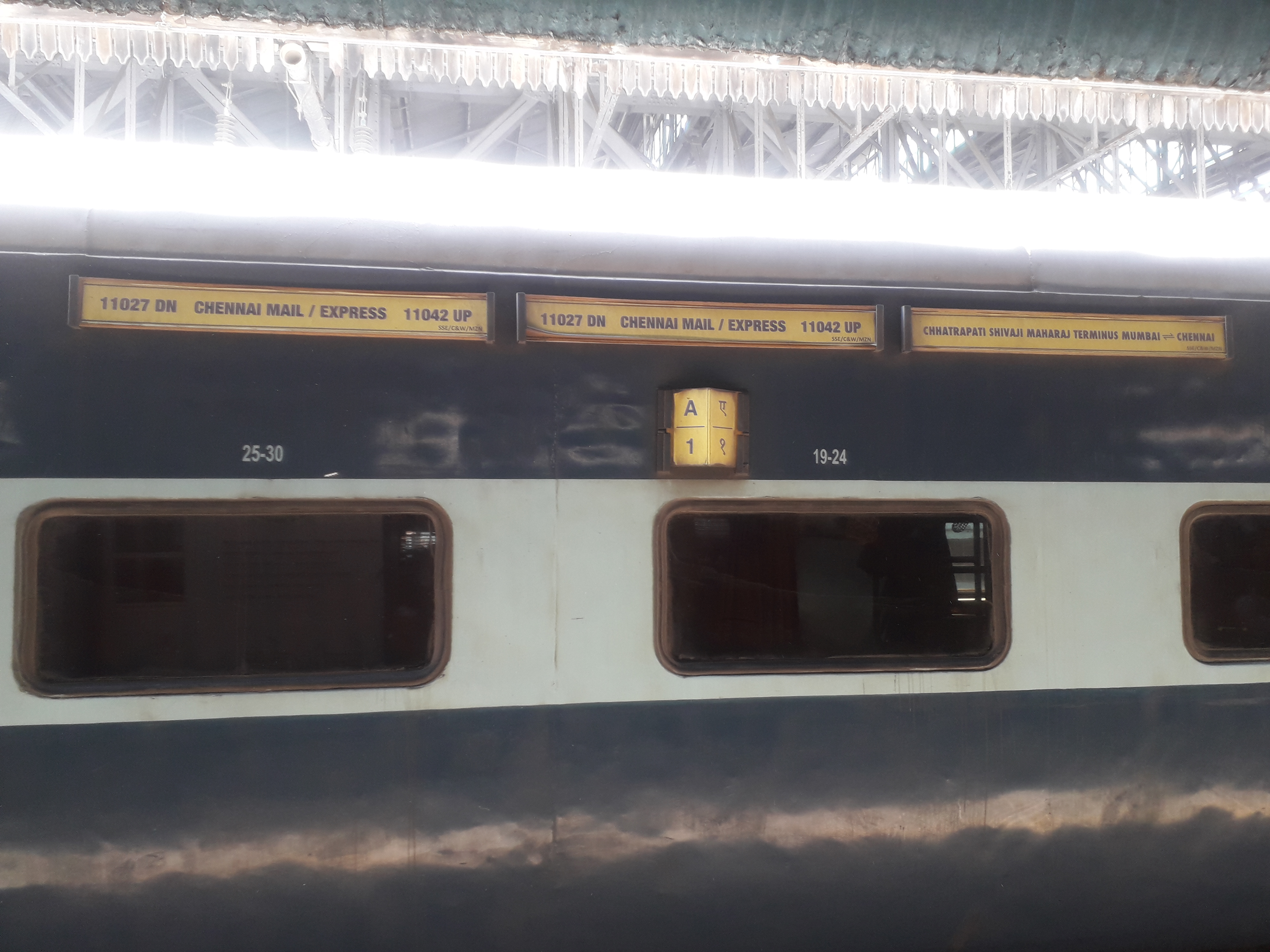
1042 Puratchi Thalaivar Dr. M.G. Ramachandran Central Railway Station–Mumbai Chhatrapati Shivaji Maharaj Terminus Express – AC 2 tier coach

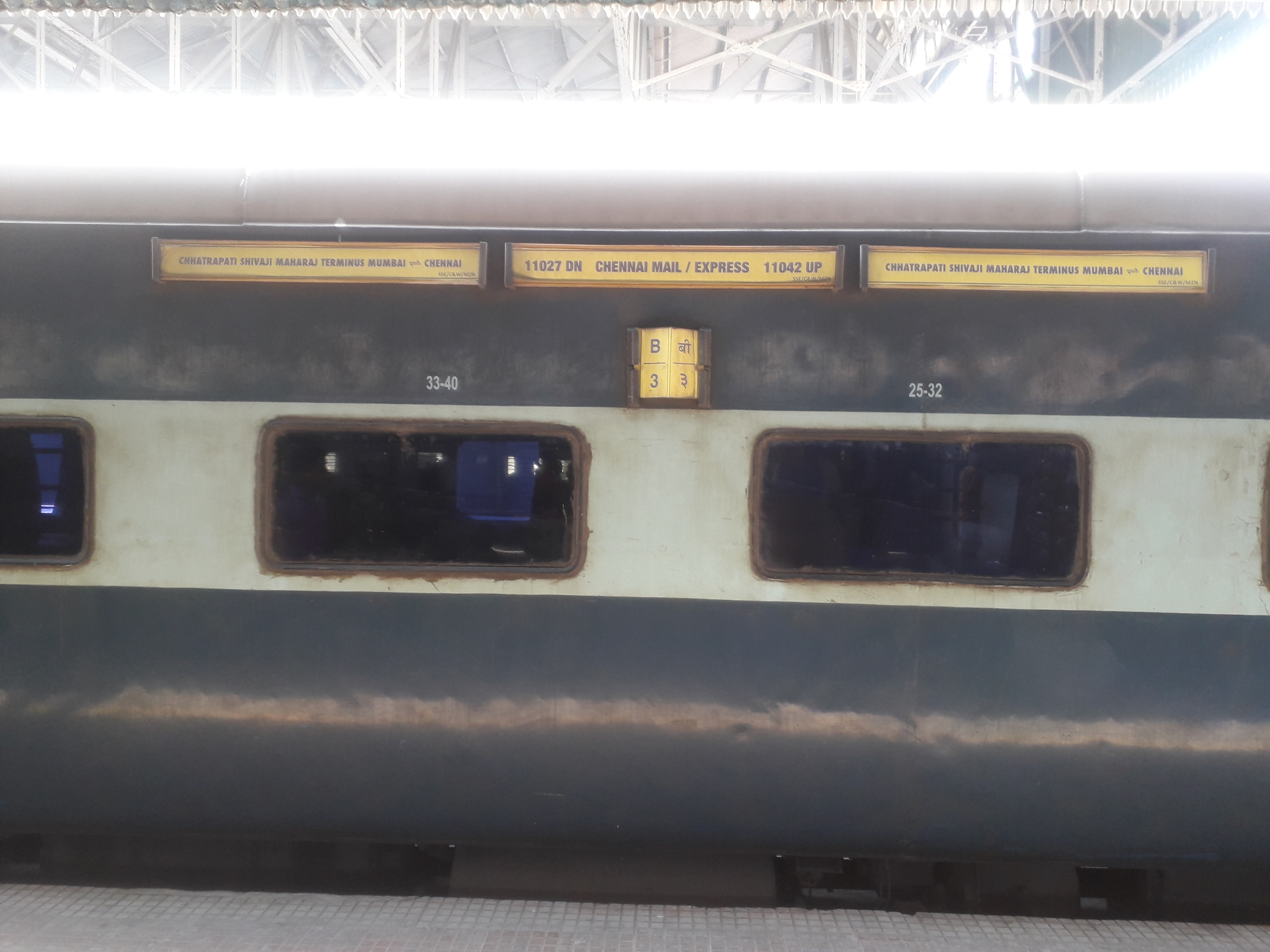
11042 Puratchi Thalaivar Dr. M.G. Ramachandran Central railway station–Mumbai Chhatrapati Shivaji Maharaj Terminus Express – AC 3 tier coach

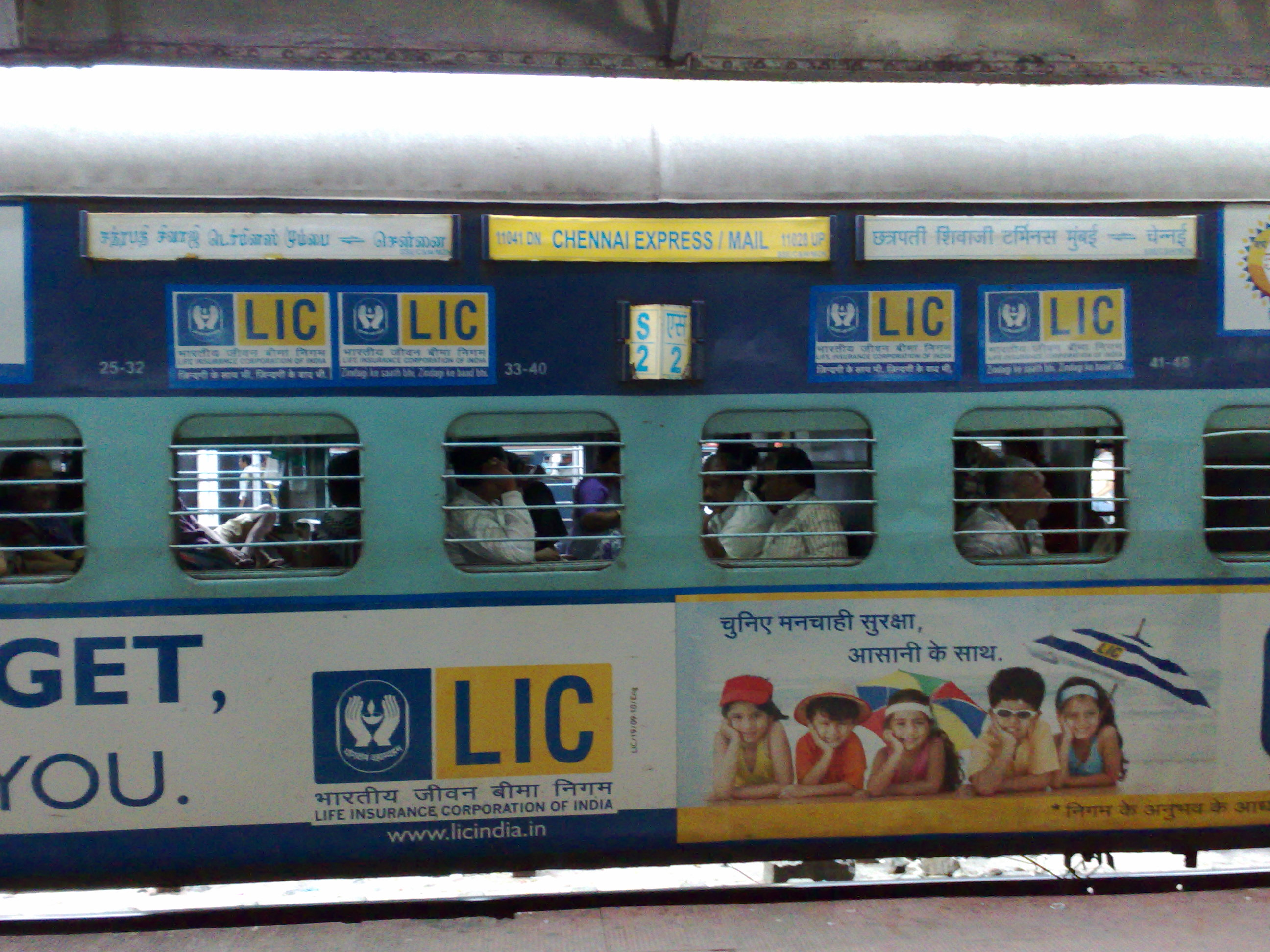
Mumbai CSMT–MGR Chennai Central Mail – Sleeper class coach

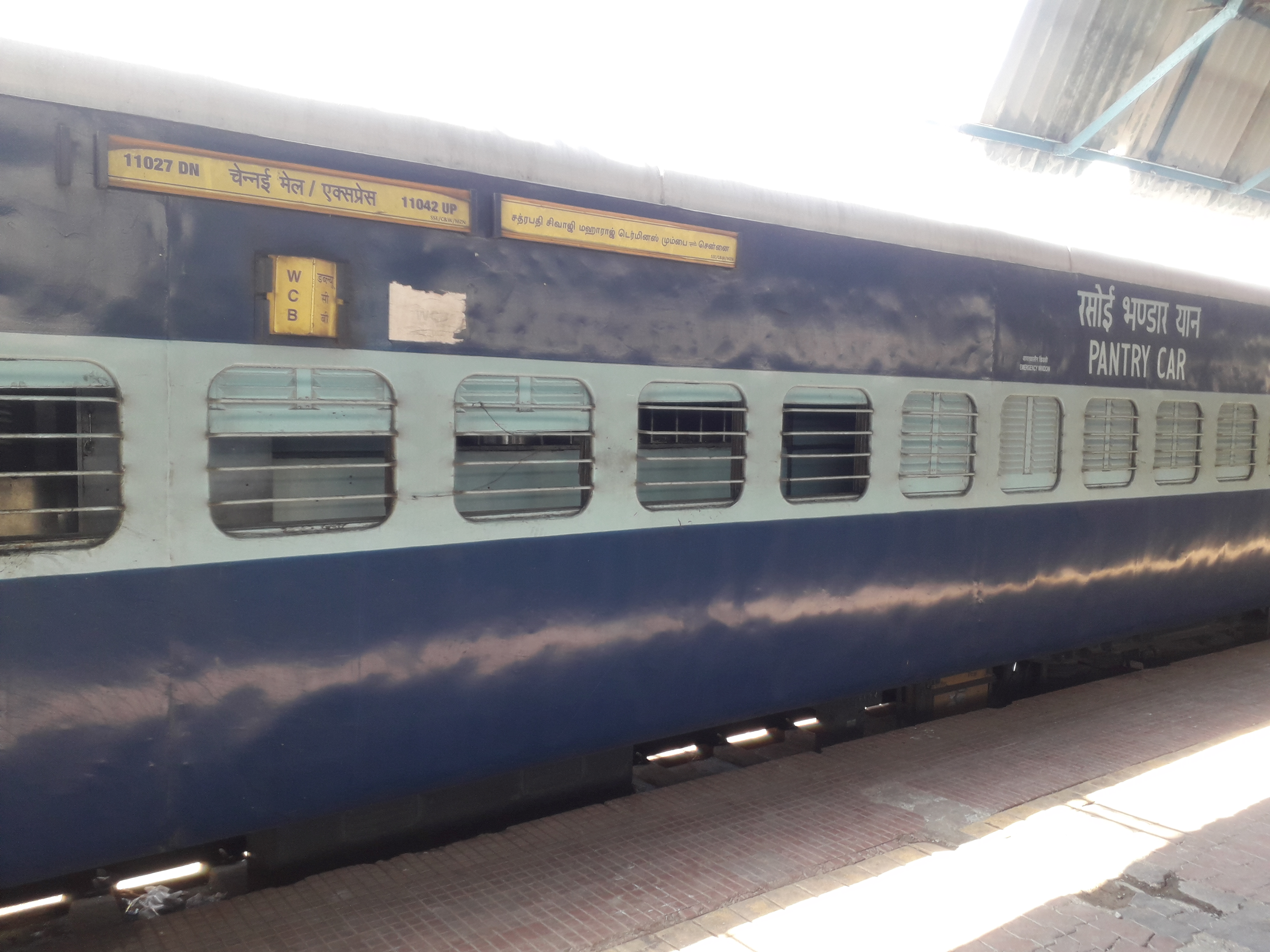
11042 Puratchi Thalaivar Dr. M.G. Ramachandran Central railway station–Mumbai Chhatrapati Shivaji Maharaj Terminus Express – Pantry car

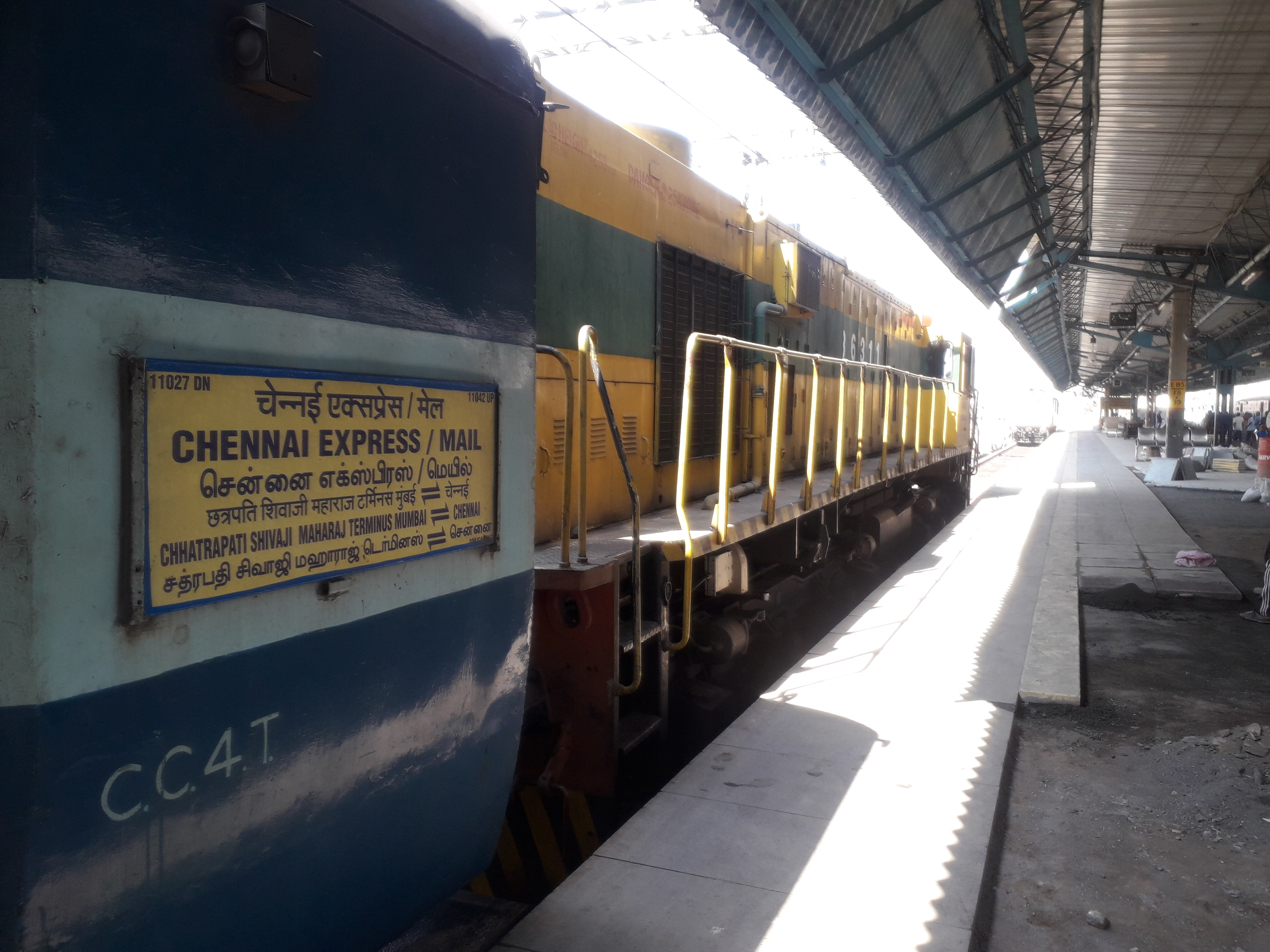
1042 Puratchi Thalaivar Dr. M.G. Ramachandran Central railway station–Mumbai Chhatrapati Shivaji Maharaj Terminus Express about to be shunted off to the marshalling yard
