= Mumbai Port Trust Railway =

Indian railway line

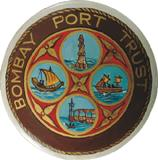
Logo

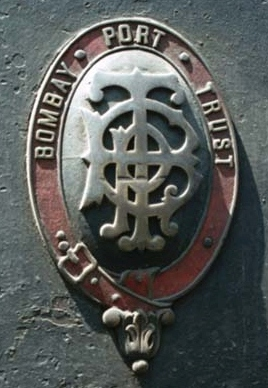
Port Trust badge carried by steam locomotives

Mumbai Port Trust Railway (also known as the Bombay Port Trust Railway) was commissioned on 1 January 1915. The railway line was being utilized for grain and fuel depots and feeding the containers at the Bombay Port.

The port trust lines were not just used for conveying cargo, but also carry passengers and troops during World War II. In the 1920s and 1930s, the Ballard Pier Mole station on the Mumbai Port Trust Railway line was a starting point for the Frontier Mail which is now known as the Golden Temple Mail.

In 1936, the company owned 26 locomotives and 684 goods wagons. The last steam locomotives were retired in 1976.
