= Ballard Pier Mole railway station =

Defunct railway station in Maharashtra, India

Ballard Pier Mole
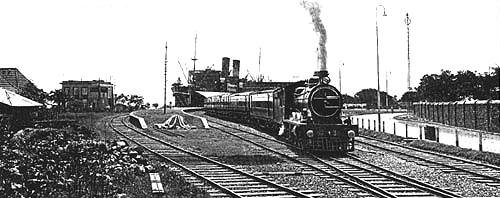
- Frontier Mail leaving the Ballard Pier station in the 1930s

General information
- Location: India
- Coordinates: 18°55′47.3″N 72°50′36.8″E
- System: Indian Railway Station
- Line: Bombay Port Trust Line
- Platforms: 2

Construction
- Structure type: At-grade

History
- Opened: 1910–1912; 114 years ago
- Closed: 1944; 82 years ago
Location
- Location within Mumbai

Ballard Pier Mole was a station of the Mumbai Port Trust Railway in the Ballard Pier precinct of South Mumbai, India. The station was the terminating station of the Frontier Mail, (now the Golden Temple Mail) and the Punjab Limited Express.

== History ==
The station was built in the period 1910–1912, and was extended in 1914. It was named after Bombay Port Trust's first chairman, J.E. Ballard. Old Photographs of the station show a station having two platforms under a single large roof. The building behind the station was itself a large one. A road was seen west of the station, and one photo shows cars parked beside the main station building. At the southern end of the station, was a clock tower-like structure. British passengers from steamers often boarded from this station. It was also an ideal picking point for mail arriving from Europe from P&O Mail steamers.

According to some sources regarding the year of commencement, the Punjab Limited Express service started from Ballard Pier Mole on 1 June 1912, and later shifted to Bombay Victoria Terminus in 1914

The Frontier Mail, however started on 1 September 1928, making its maiden journey from Colaba Terminus station. During the winter months from September to December, it used to depart from the mole station.

== Gallery Links ==
- https://oldbombay.in/ballard-pierre-station/
- https://twitter.com/mumbaiheritage/status/800379463036870656/photo/1
- https://www.past-india.com/photos-items/ballard-pier-mole-station-bombay-old-postcard-1925/
- Aerial view of Ballard Pier Mole station
