= Golden Temple Mail =

Train in India

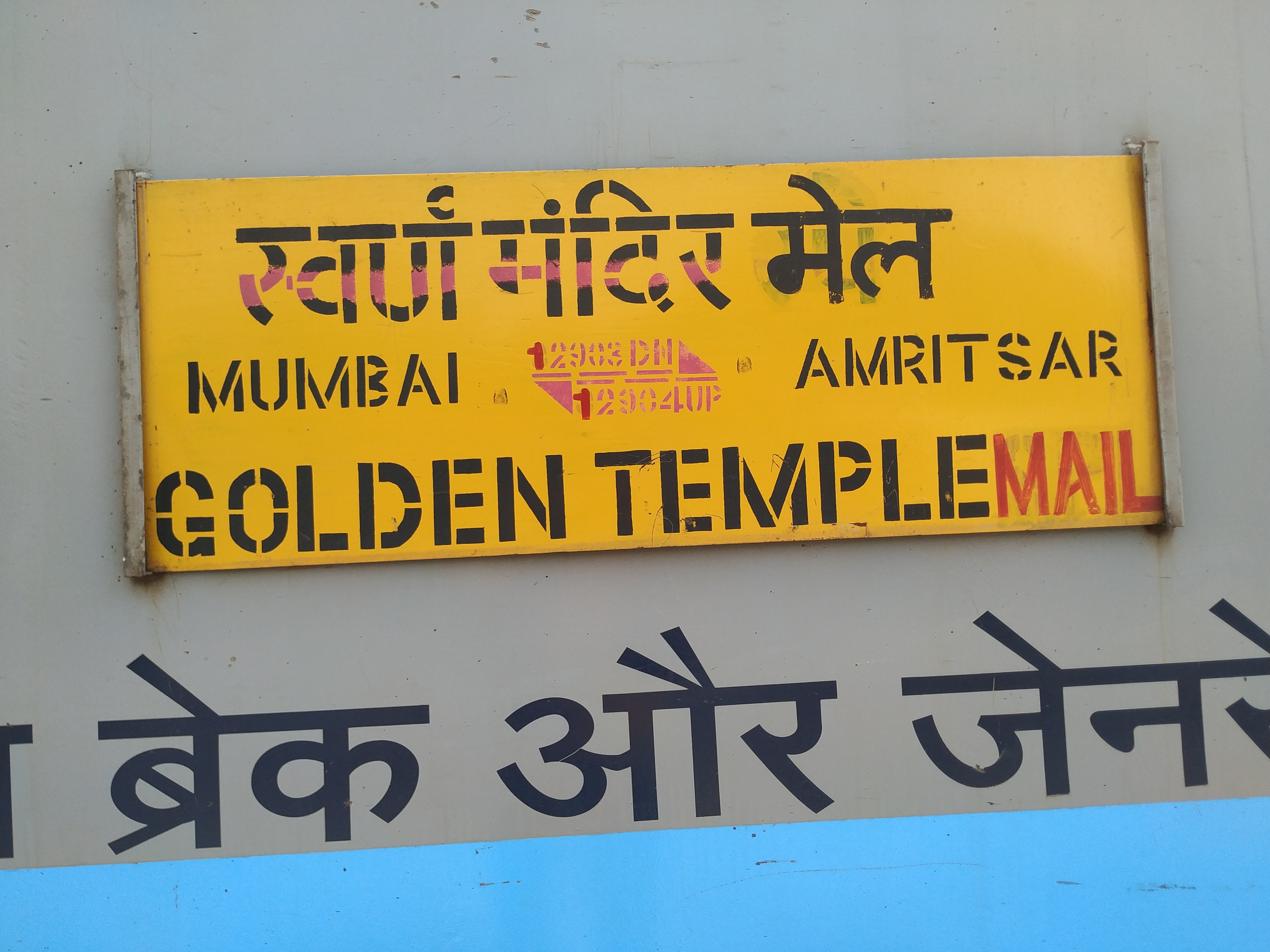
- Golden Temple Mail train board.

Overview
- Service type: Mail/Express
- Locale: Maharashtra, Gujarat, Madhya Pradesh, Rajasthan, Uttar Pradesh, Haryana, Delhi & Punjab
- First service: 1 September 1928; 98 years ago
- Current operator: Western Railways

Route
- Termini: Bandra Terminus (BDTS); Amritsar Junction (ASR)
- Stops: 35
- Distance travelled: 1,893 km (1,176 mi)
- Average journey time: 29hrs 00mnts
- Service frequency: Daily
- Train number: 12903 / 12904

On-board services
- Class: AC 1st Class, AC 2 tier, AC 3 tier, Sleeper class, General Unreserved
- Seating arrangements: Yes
- Sleeping arrangements: Yes
- Catering facilities: Available
- Observation facilities: Large windows
- Baggage facilities: Overhead racks

Technical
- Rolling stock: LHB coaches
- Track gauge: 1,676 mm (5 ft 6 in)
- Operating speed: 65 km/h (40 mph) average including halts
Route map
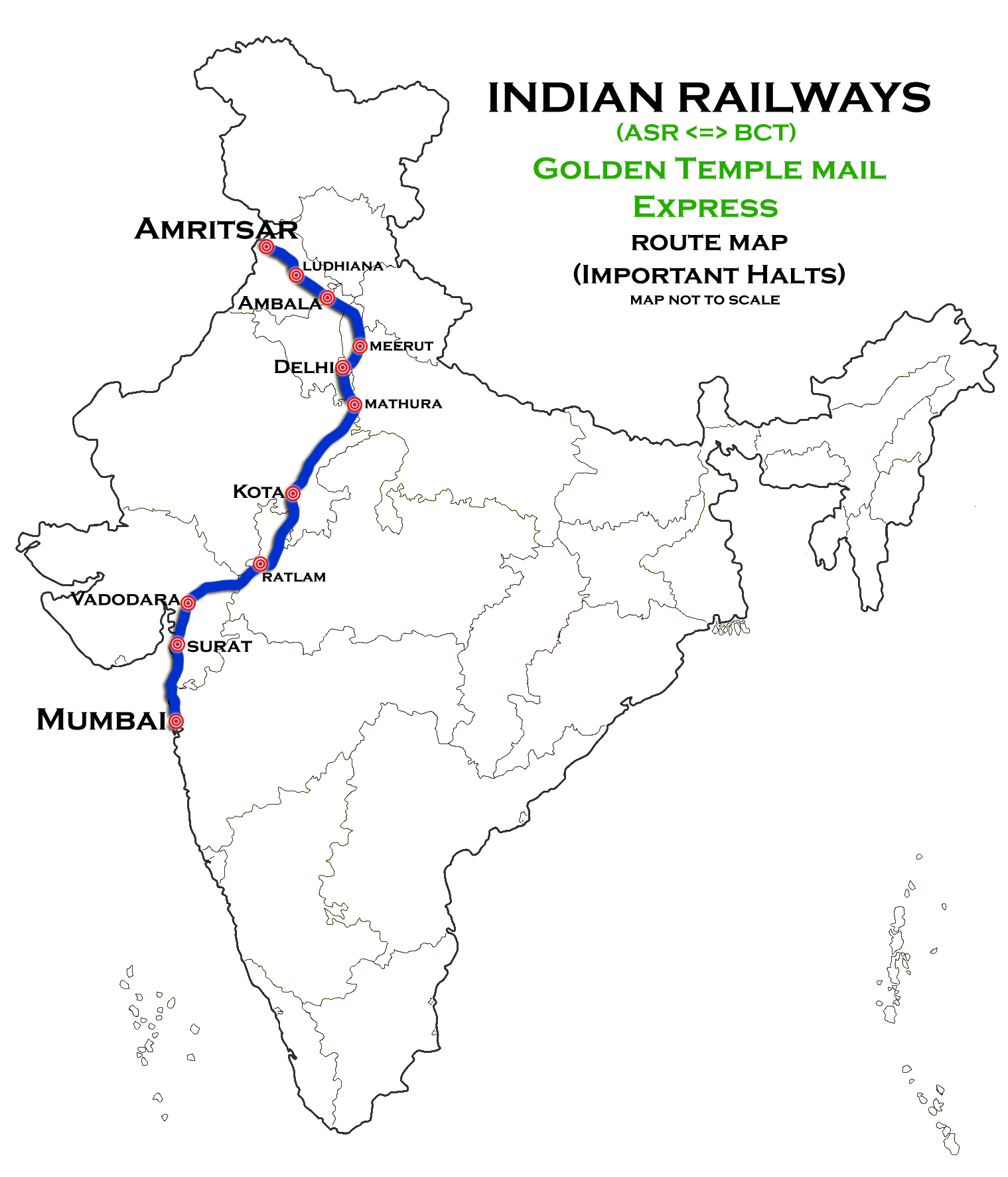

The 12903 / 12904 Golden Temple SF Mail is a Daily Superfast Mail train operated by the Indian Railways that runs daily between Bandra Terminus (BDTS) in Maharashtra and Amritsar Junction (ASR) in Punjab. It is the fastest daily train from Mumbai to Amritsar. It is named after the Golden Temple at Amritsar. The train has operated with modern LHB coaches since 29 September 2020. Before the Partition of India, it would ferry passengers arriving by steamer from Europe directly from the Ballard Pier in Bombay to the city of Peshawar on India's North-West Frontier. The train ran as the Frontier Mail between 1928 and 1996. Ice slabs were used to cool first class coaches.

It operates as train number 12903 from Bandra Terminus to Amritsar Junction and as train number 12904 in the reverse direction.

== History ==
With the opening of the Indian Midland Railway's broad-gauge line between Itarsi and Tundla on 1 March 1889, the first through communication on the broad gauge between Bombay and Delhi was established. At the outset, 2 through carriages from Bombay were attached to the East Indian Railway's 1 Up Howrah–Kalka Mail at Tundla. From thereon, the train ran through to Kalka and Lahore with the name 5 Up Bombay mail. This pattern of operations continued until the early 1900s.

After the opening of the Agra–Delhi Chord railway in 1905, the Great Indian Peninsula Railway and the North Western State Railway started a new through service between Bombay and Lahore, going through Agra, Mathura, Delhi, Bathinda, Ferozepur, Kasur and Raiwind. The new service, christened The Punjab Mail, commenced operations from 15 March 1905, covering the distance of 2,560 kilometres (1,590 mi) in 50 hours.

From 1st April 1911, the Bombay, Baroda and Central India Railway (BB&CIR) started operating a through service between Bombay Colaba Terminus and Peshawar, running through Surat, Baroda, Nagda, Ratlam, Kota, Mathura, Delhi, Saharanpur, Ambala, Amritsar and Lahore, known as the Northern Express, covering 2,487 kilometres (1,545 mi) in 48 hours. In response, the Great Indian Peninsular Railway extended the Punjab Mail to run through to Peshawar. However, owing to the lack of line capacity, both the Punjab Mail and the Northern Express ran together clubbed as a single train between Lahore and Peshawar via Narowal, Sialkot, Rawalpindi route until Lahore-Gujranwala-Rawalpindi line came up in 1920s.

In an effort to improve the quality of the train service, the BB&CI introduced the P&O Express (named after the Peninsular and Oriental Steam Navigation Company) from 27th October, 1927. This effort proved to be successful, and therefore, it was decided that the service be regularised. The erstwhile Northern Express (by now, called the Bombay Peshawar Mail), was sped, and it ran the same schedule as the P&O Express. It would operate with five coaches along with a luxury dining cum lounge car. The passengers of this train had access to luxurious retiring rooms at the stations on the route

From 1st September 1928, the train began operating as the Frontier Mail. The then agent (now known as General Manager) of BB&CI Railway, Sir Ernest Jackson, believed that this train would compete well with the rival GIP Railway's Punjab Limited. Indeed, the Frontier Mail with its shorter route, reduced travel time to just seventy-two hours. During the autumn months between September and December, the train would depart from the Ballard Pier Mole station, on the Bombay Port Trust line. This was for the convenience of the British who arrived in India by the P&O steamer. For the rest of the year, while the train would ply from Colaba, a separate train would run from the mole station in order to enable steamer connectivity. Upon its arrival in Bombay, The BB&CIR Headquarter building outside the Churchgate station would be floodlit to announce the train's safe arrival.

Between 1928 and 1930, a flurry of changes took place in the train services between Bombay and Delhi. As a result of these changes, the Punjab Mail's run was terminated at Lahore from 1 March 1930. However, a bogie composite I and II class through carriage to Peshawar was still run on the Punjab Mail, being attached to the North Western Railway's Northern Express train between Lahore and Peshawar. For these years, the Frontier Mail continued the same route as the former Northern Express, i.e. via Bathinda between Delhi and Lahore. However from 1st September 1930, it was rerouted to run via Ambala and Amritsar on the way to Lahore. Even in the present day, the train follows this route until its terminus at Amritsar.

The train was popular for its punctuality. It was believed that one's Rolex could let them down, but the Frontier Mail couldn't. In fact, when in August 1929, the train arrived 15 minutes late, the driver was asked to reason out the cause for the delay.

During the unrest following the partition of India, the Punjab Mail, along with a host of other trains running to Lahore and beyond, was terminated at Delhi for the period between 1947 to 1948. Shortly after the partition and nationalization of Railways, the service was extended to Dera Baba Nanak near Amritsar on the India–Pakistan border. The train still runs on this route to this day but uptill Amritsar only. The train was finally renamed as the Golden Temple Mail in 1996.

The Frontier Mail also finds a place in romanticised biographies of film actor Prithviraj Kapoor who is believed to have travelled to Bombay from his hometown of Peshawar by the Frontier Mail in 1928 to act in films. Hunterwali, probably India's first action heroine, acted in the film Miss Frontier Mail. The Frontier Mail was the first air conditioned train in the Indian Peninsula. It received an air-conditioned compartment in 1934. Radio facility was provided for the first time on the Golden Temple Mail.

== Coaches ==
The 12903/04 Golden Temple Mail has one AC First Tier, two AC 2 Tier, six AC 3 Tier, six Sleeper Class, four General unreserved coaches, one Seating cum Luggage rake and End-On-Generation (EOG) coach. It also has one Pantry car.

== Service ==
The Golden Temple Mail runs between Bandra Terminus and Amritsar Junction. It is a daily service covering the distance of 1891 km in 29 hours 00 minutes as 12903 Golden Temple Mail averaging 65.28 km/h and 29 hours 15 minutes as 12904 Golden Temple Mail averaging 64.72 km/h.

== Train Crash ==
- The train operating the service collided with another train in 1955, killing one and injuring 34.
- The Golden Temple Mail aka Frontier Mail involved in 1998 Khanna rail collision : The Khanna rail disaster occurred on 26 November 1998 near Khanna on the Khanna-Ludhiana section of India's Northern Railway in Punjab, at 03:15 when the Calcutta-bound Jammu Tawi-Sealdah Express collided with six derailed coaches of the Amritsar-bound "Frontier Mail" which were lying in its path. At least 212 people were killed; the trains were estimated to be carrying 2,500 passengers. The initial derailment was caused by a broken rail. The crash is among the deadliest rail accidents in India.

== Traction ==
earlier with glossy ICF coaches it was hauled by WDM-2. Nowadays It is now regularly hauled by a Vadodara Loco Shed based WAP-7 locomotive from end to end.

== Route & halts ==
The train runs from Bandra Terminus via Borivali, Surat, Vadodara Junction, Ratlam Junction, Nagda Junction, Kota Junction, Sawai Madhopur Junction, Gangapur City, Bharatpur Junction, Mathura Junction, Hazrat Nizamuddin, Ghaziabad Junction, Meerut City, Muzaffarnagar,Saharanpur Junction, Ambala Cantonment Junction, Ludhiana Junction, Phagwara, Jalandhar City Junction, Beas Junction to Amritsar Junction. The train previously use to Originate from Mumbai Central Terminus.

== Gallery ==
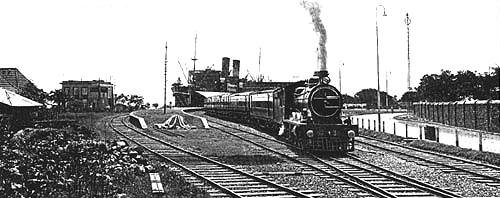
The Frontier Mail departing Ballard Pier Mole Station (c. 1930s)

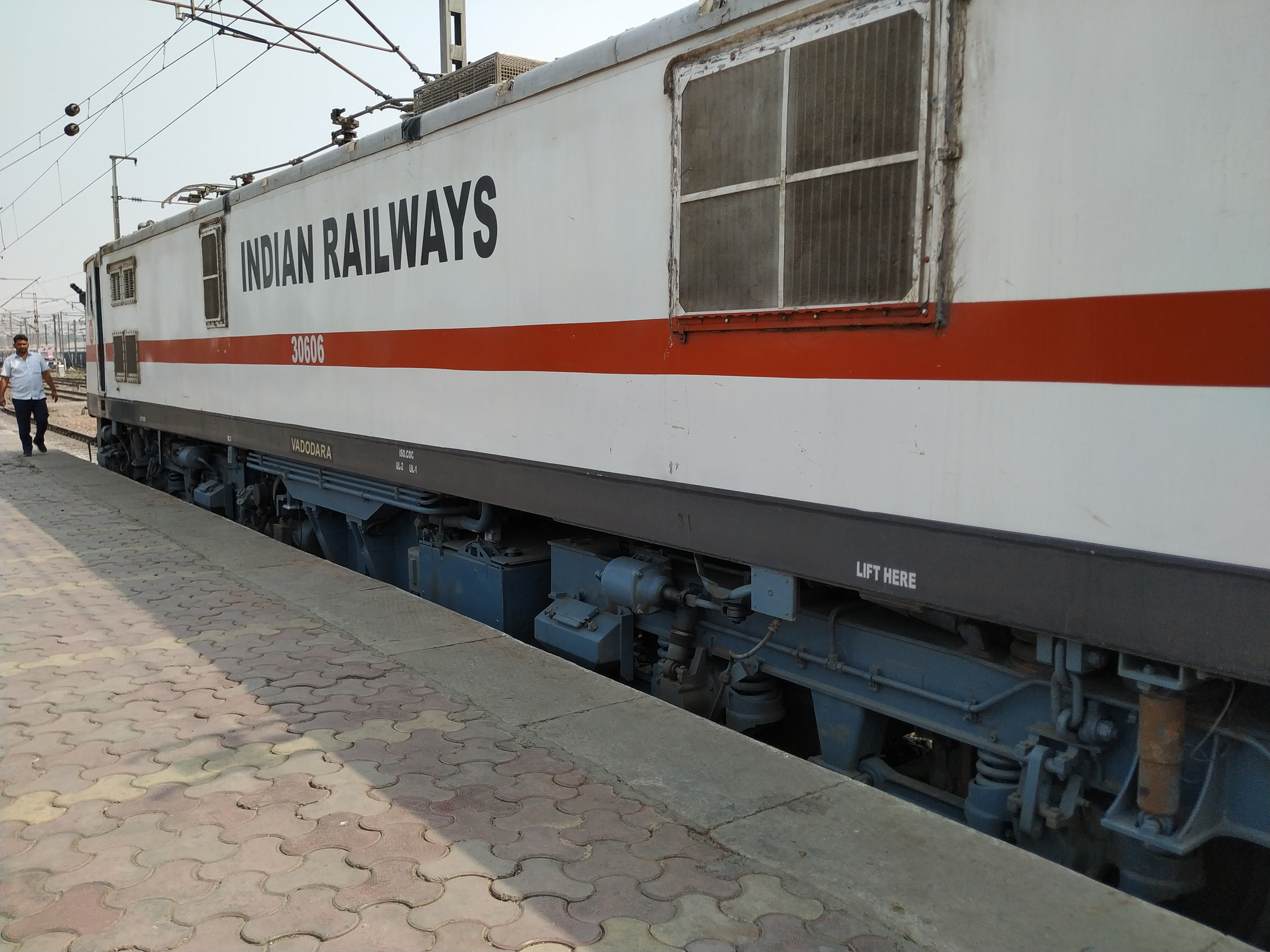
Vadodra based WAP-7 locomotive for Golden Temple Mail.

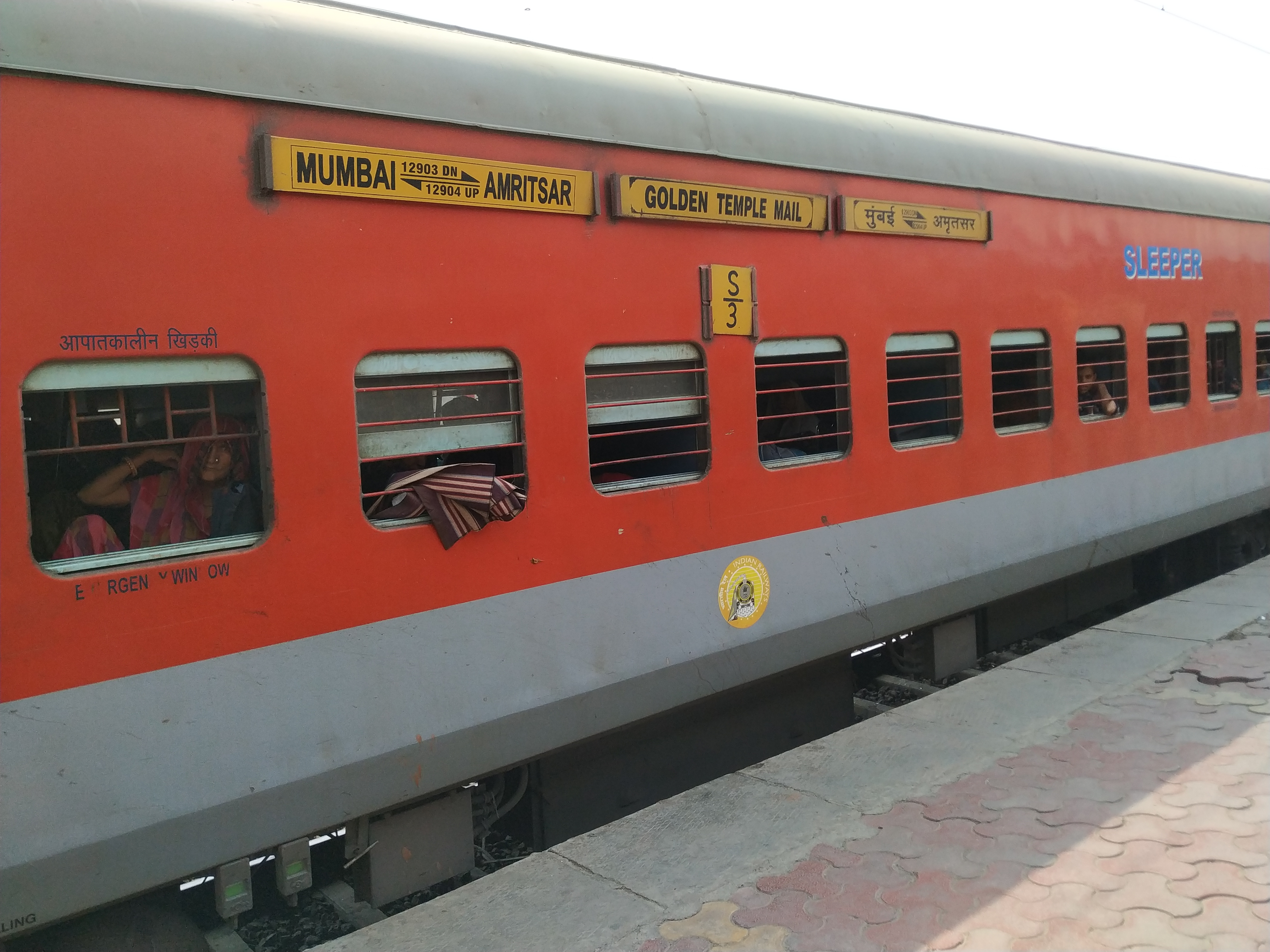
Sleeper Non-AC LHB coaches of Golden Temple Mail.

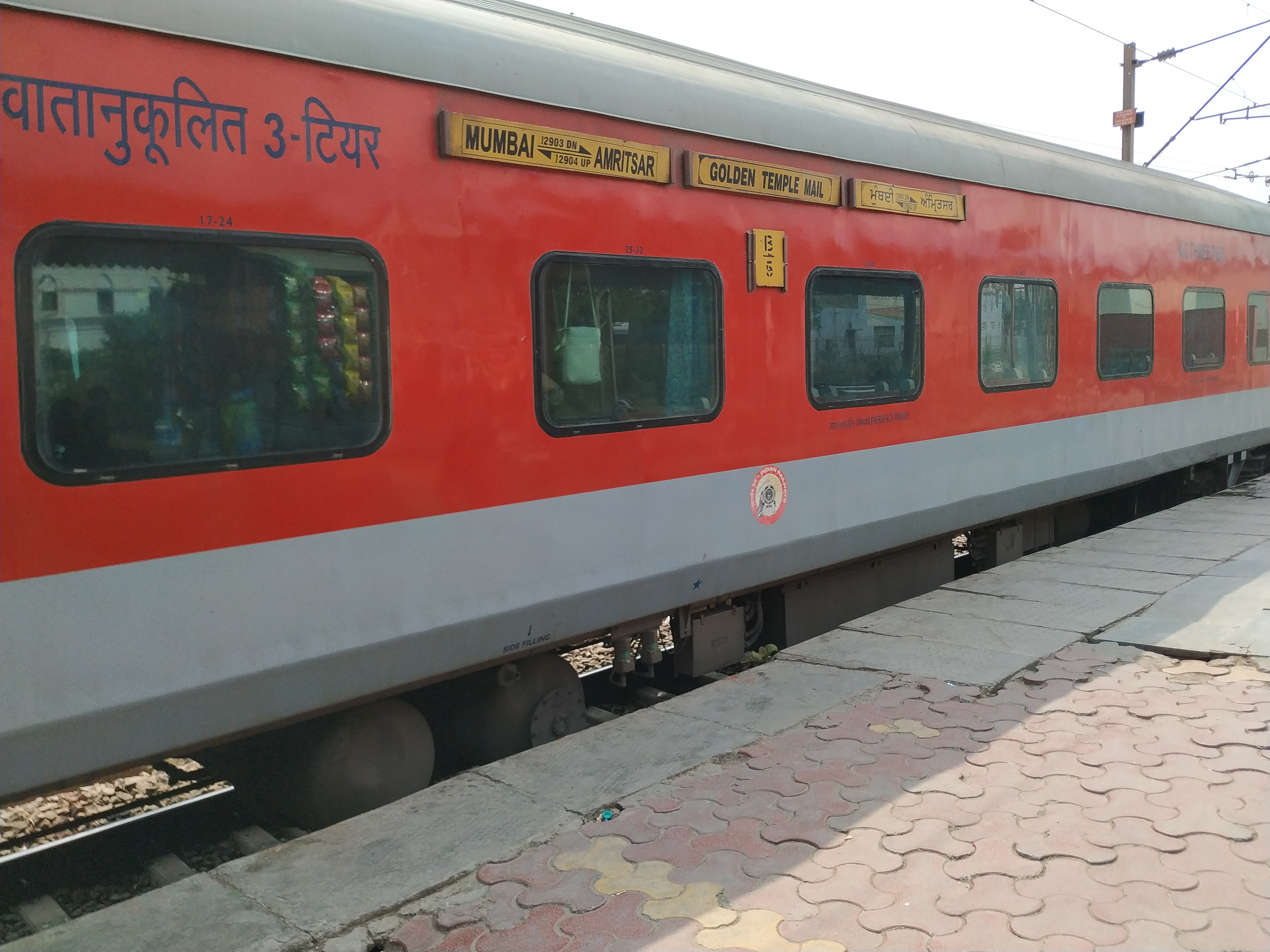
AC 3 tier LHB coach of Golden Temple Mail.

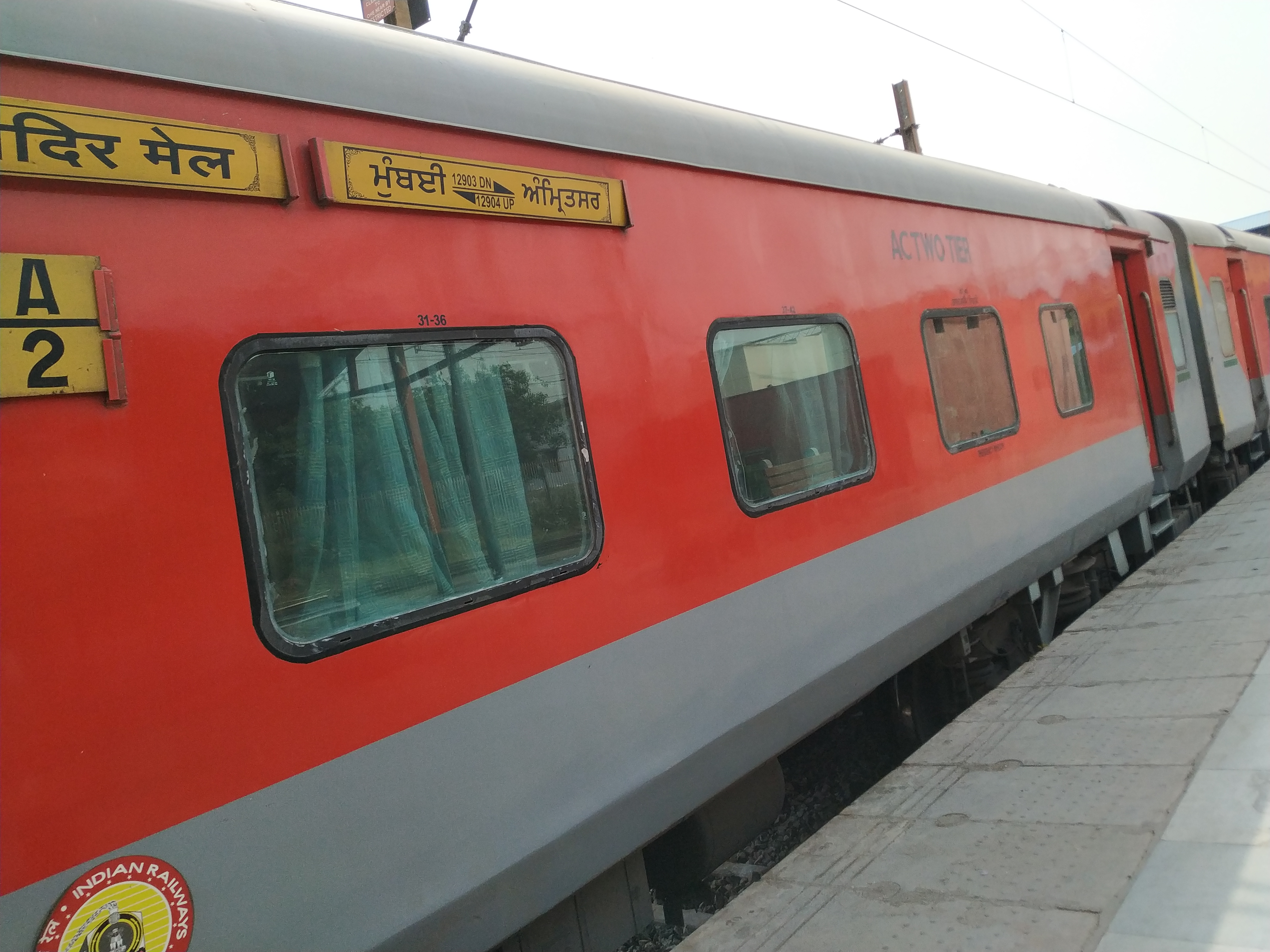
AC 2 tier LHB coach of Golden Temple Mail.

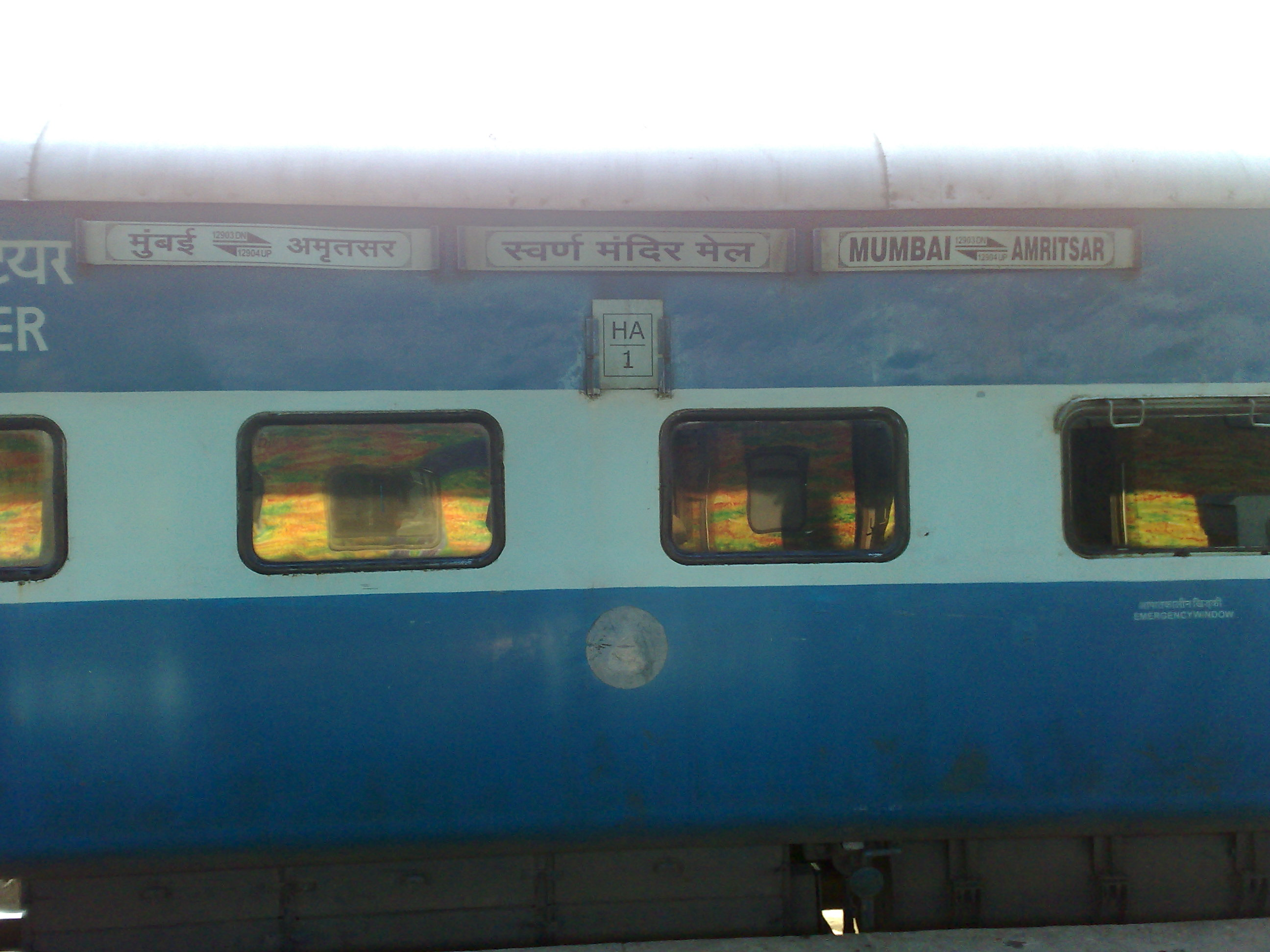
12903 Golden Temple Mail Blue ICF coach HA1

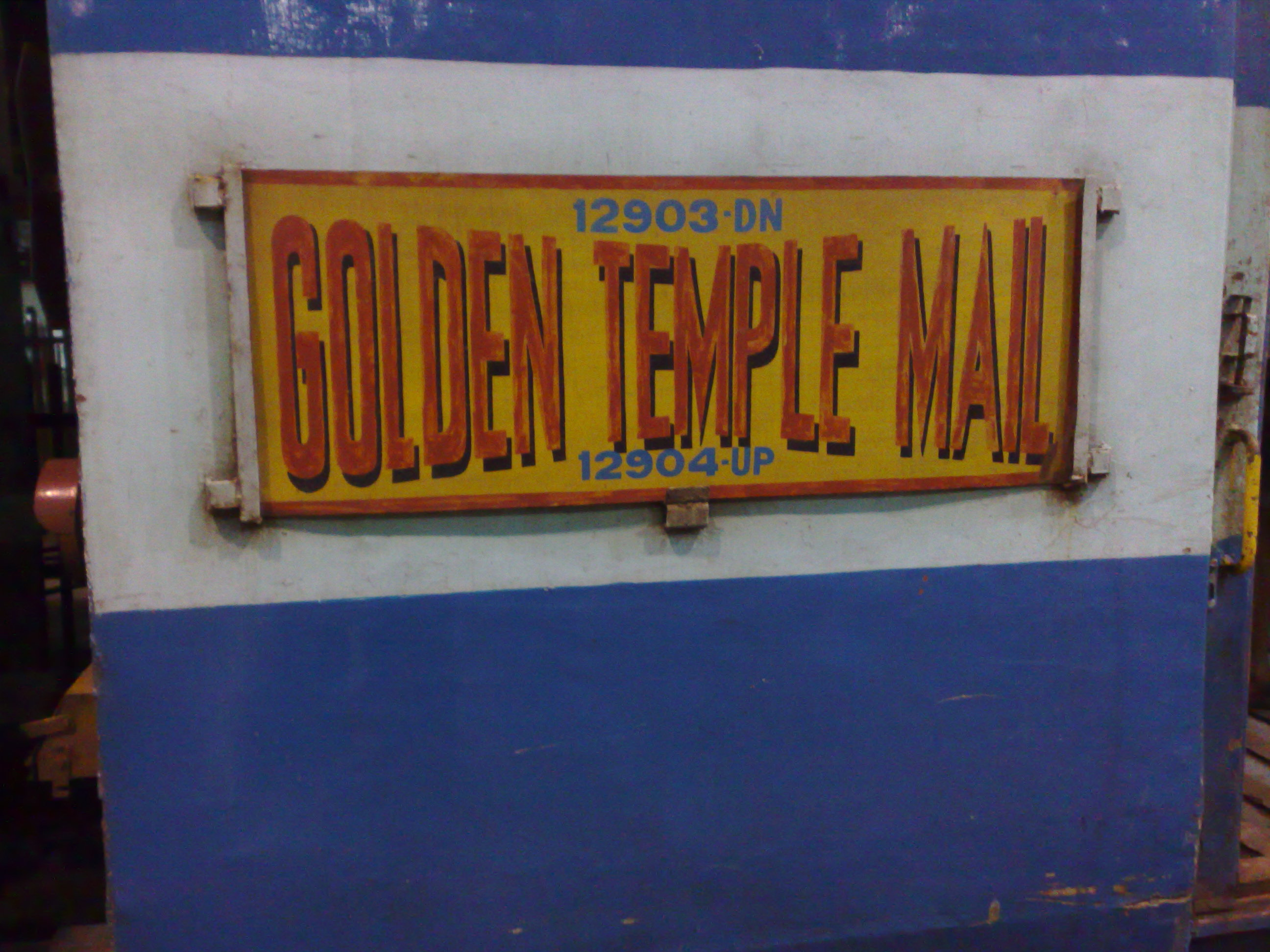
12903 Golden Temple Mail Blue ICF coaches

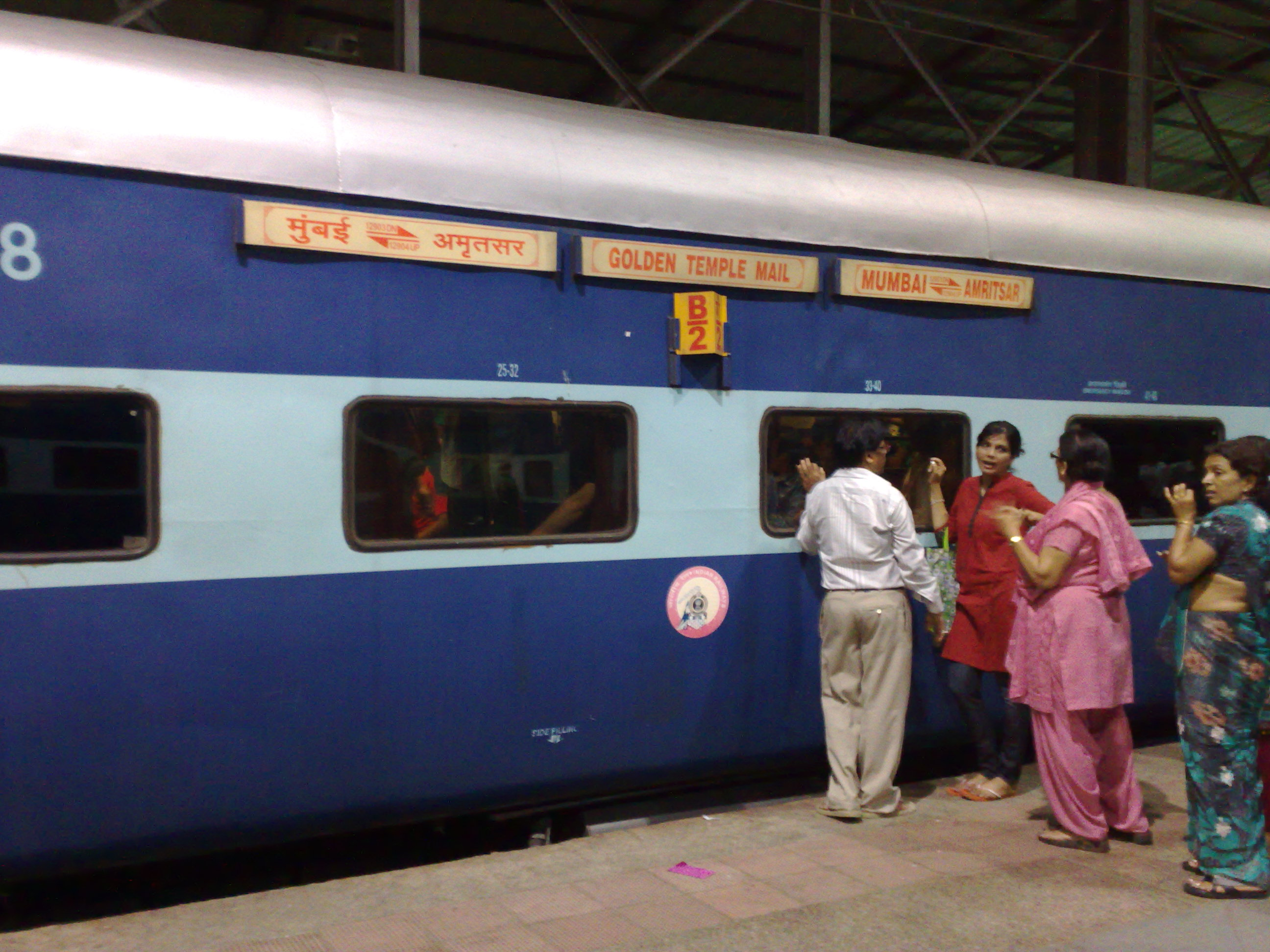
Golden Temple Mail – Blue ICF AC 3 tier coach

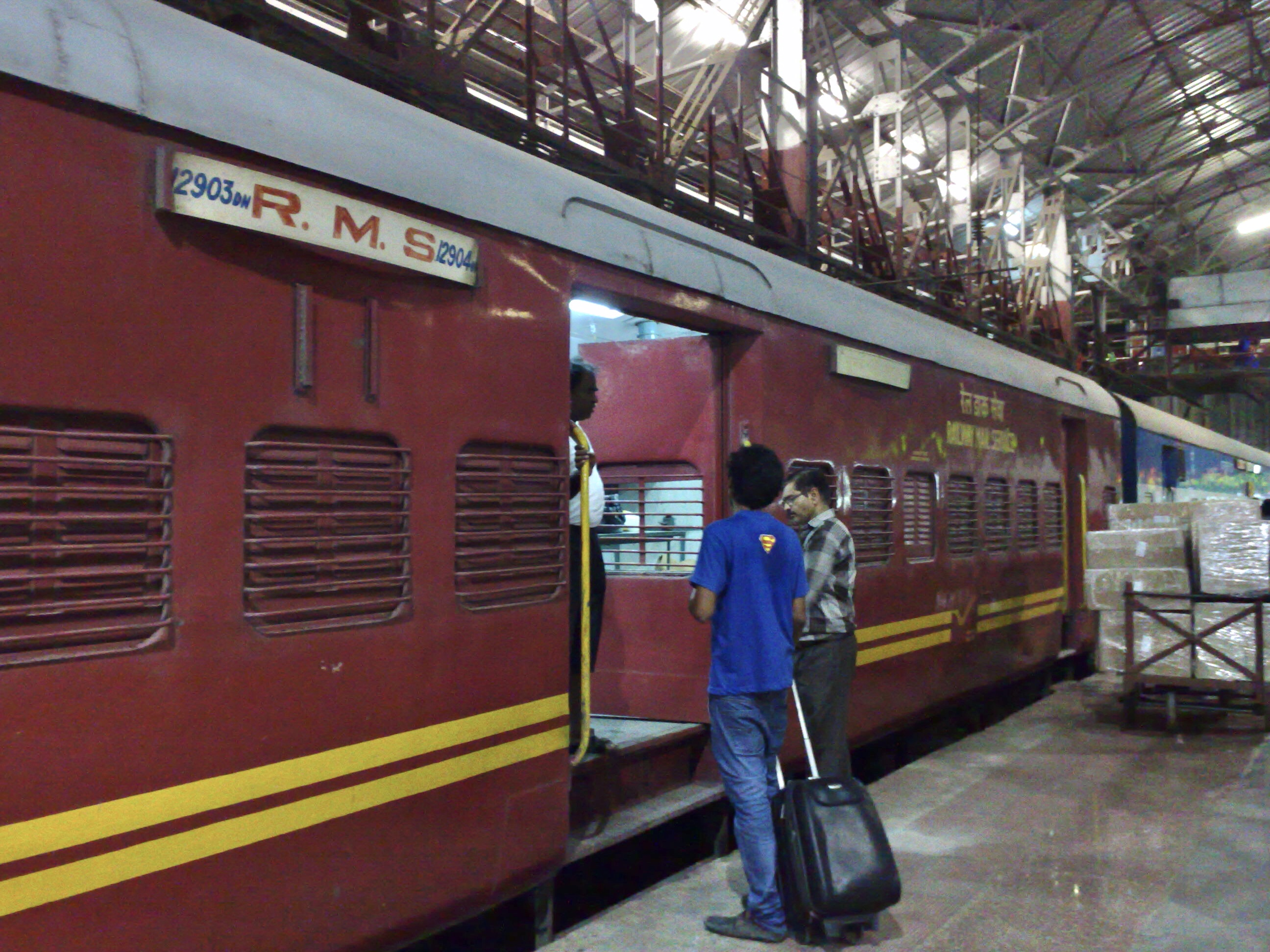
Red ICF Mail coach of Golden Temple Mail

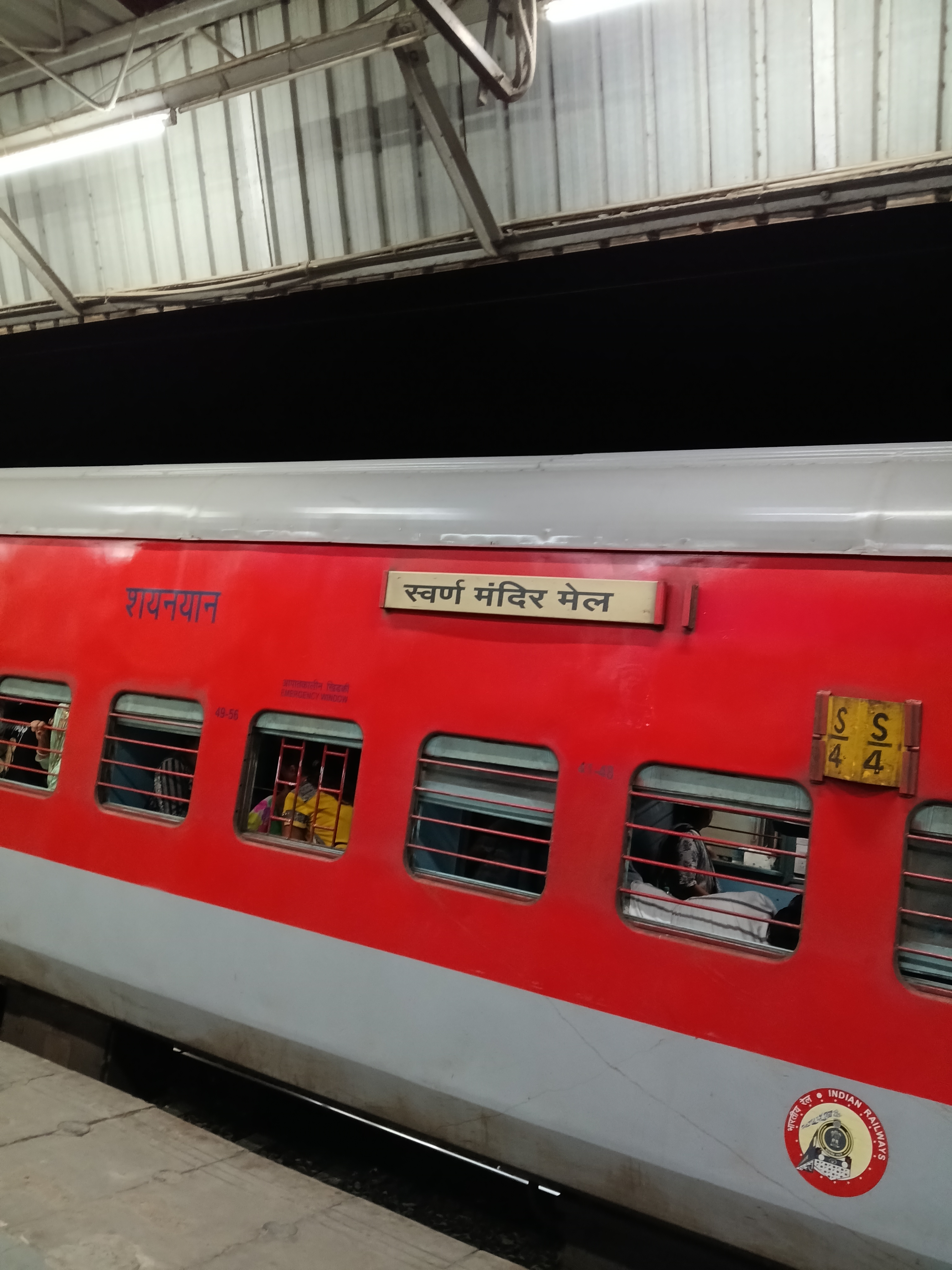
Golden Temple Mail At Jalandhar City Junction
