= Tourism in Uttar Pradesh =

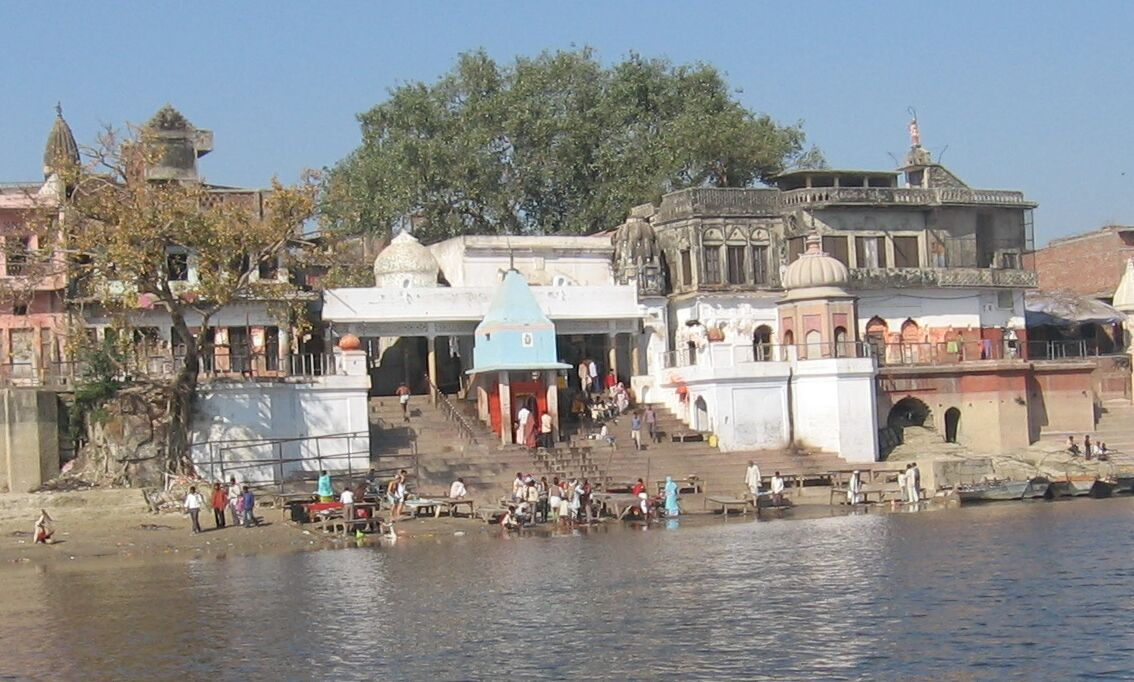
Brahmavart Ghat ghat in Kanpur, Uttar Pradesh, India

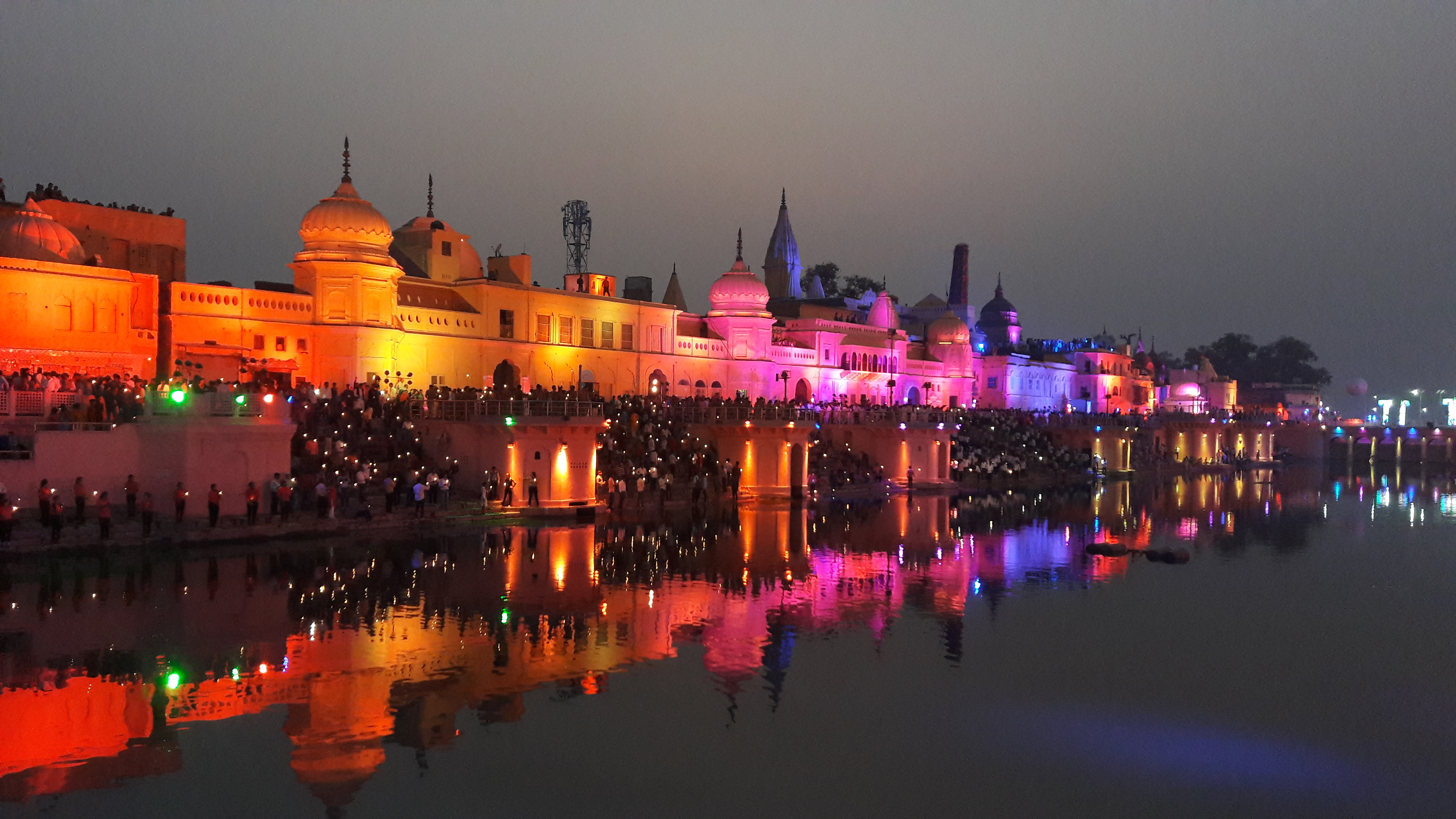
Ram ki Paidi ghat in Ayodhya, Uttar Pradesh, India

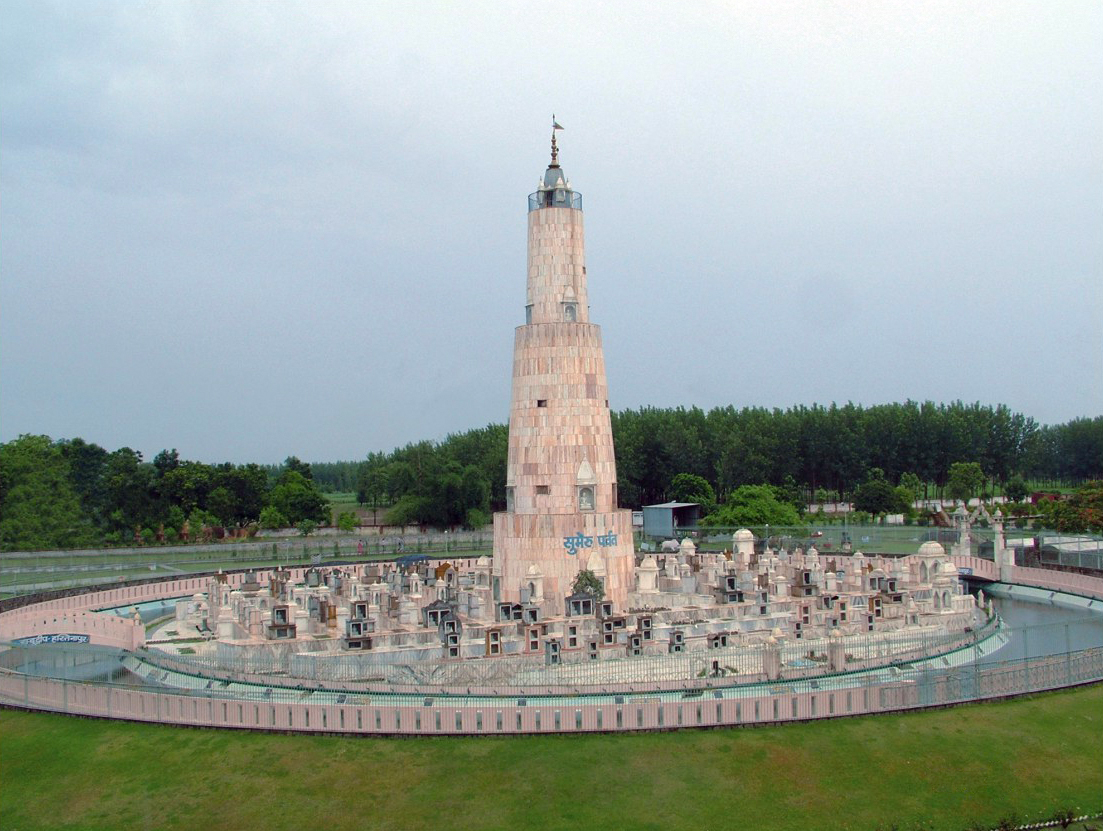
The famous depiction of Mount Meru at Jambudweep (mythological), in Uttar Pradesh.

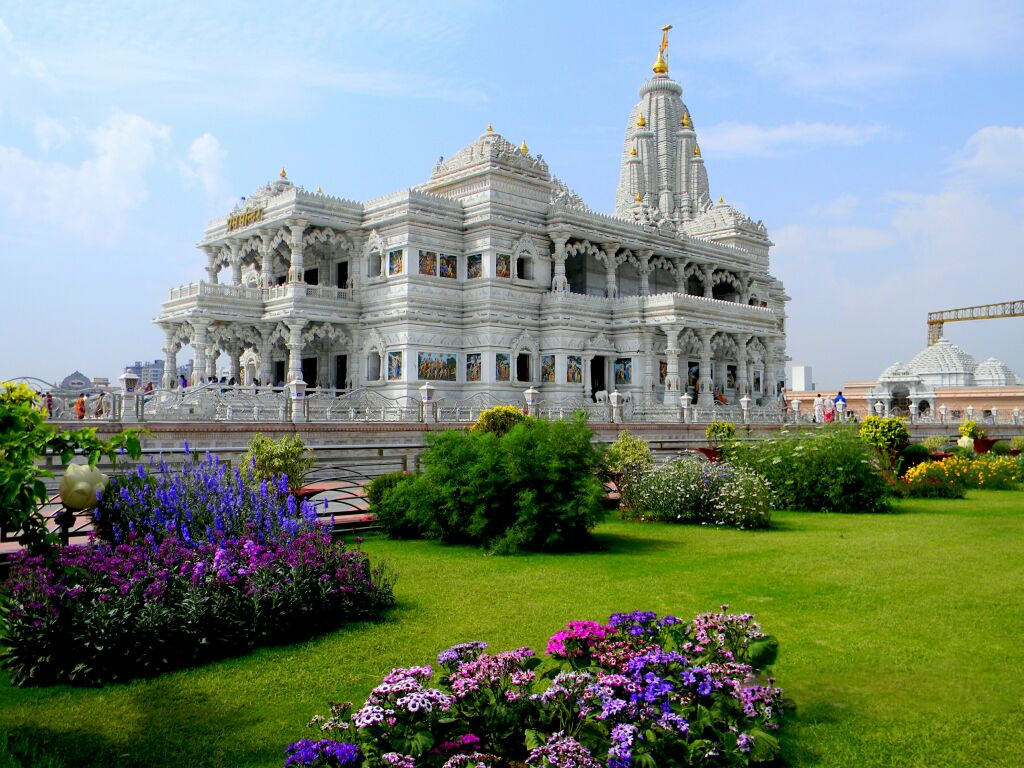
Prem mandir from main gate in Vrindavan, Mathura, India Ahilya Ghat, Varanasi Agra Fort Sarnath

Situated in the northern part of India, bordering the capital of India New Delhi, Uttar Pradesh is a popular tourist destination for both Indians and non-Indians alike in India. The most populous state of India, Uttar Pradesh contains many historical monuments and places of religious significance. Geographically, Uttar Pradesh is highly diverse, with the Himalayan foothills in the extreme north and the Gangetic Plain in the centre. It is also home of India's most visited sites, Hinduism's holiest city, Varanasi. Kumbh city, Prayagraj. Kathak, one of the eight forms of Indian classical dances, originated from Uttar Pradesh. Uttar Pradesh is at the heart of India, hence it is also known as The Heartland of India. Cuisine of Uttar Pradesh like Awadhi cuisine, Mughlai cuisine and Bhojpuri cuisine are very famous not only in India but also many places abroad.

Uttar Pradesh is known for its rich culture and tradition. It is home to Ayodhya and Mathura birthplace of Lord Rama, Lord Krishna and Bhagwan Parshuram respectively. Uttar Pradesh attracts many national and international tourists. The Taj Mahal, one of the New Seven Wonders of the World in Agra is also located in Uttar Pradesh.

There are different places one can visit in Uttar Pradesh. Agra, Ayodhya, Jhansi, Kanpur and Lucknow are historical cities famous for their monuments. Mathura, Vrindavan, Gokul, Varanasi, Vindhyachal, Ayodhya, Gorakhpur and Prayagraj are holy cities for Hindus and Kushinagar and Sarnath are important Buddhist places among the main four pilgrimage sites related to the life of Gautama Buddha. Noida is the most developed urban city of Uttar Pradesh.

To boost the tourism in the state from within the country and other parts of the world, the Government of Uttar Pradesh established an Uttar Pradesh Heritage Arc covering the cities of Agra, Kanpur, Lucknow and Varanasi.

== Agra ==
The 17th-century Taj Mahal in Agra is the most popular monument in India, attracting over 7 million visitors per year. Agra is home to four World Heritage Sites in Taj Mahal, Agra Fort, Sikandra & the Fatehpur Sikri. Agra is also home to many other Mughal buildings like Akbar's Tomb, Itmad-Ud-Daulah etc. Dayal Bagh is an under-construction temple that many visit. The lifelike carving in marble is not seen anywhere else in India.

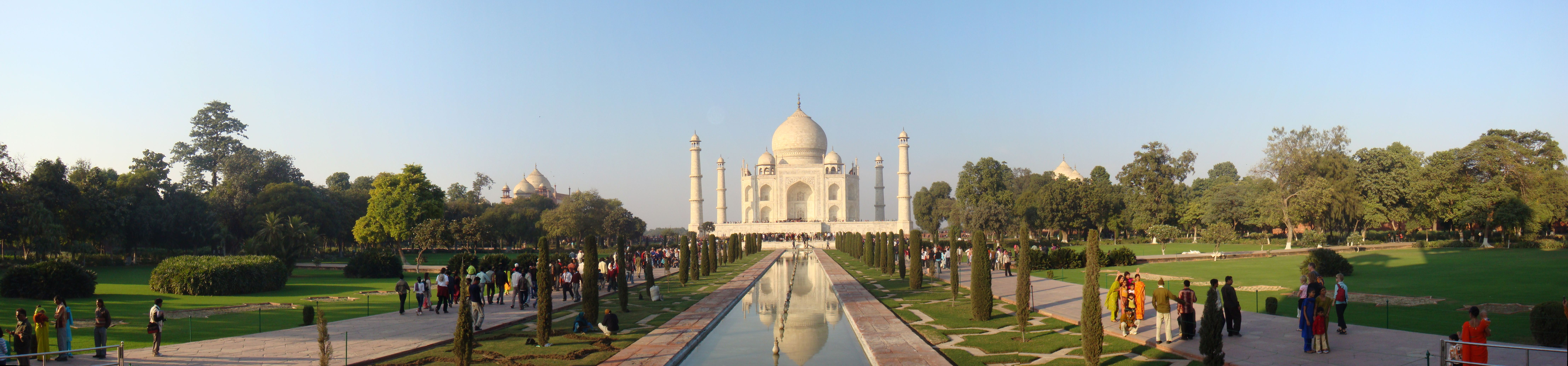
Panoramic view of the Taj Mahal.

== Hindu religious sites ==
Millions of tourists and pilgrims visit the cities like Prayagraj, Varanasi, Vindhyachal, Mathura, Gorakhpur, and Ayodhya, as those are considered to be the holiest cities in India.

=== Kanpur ===
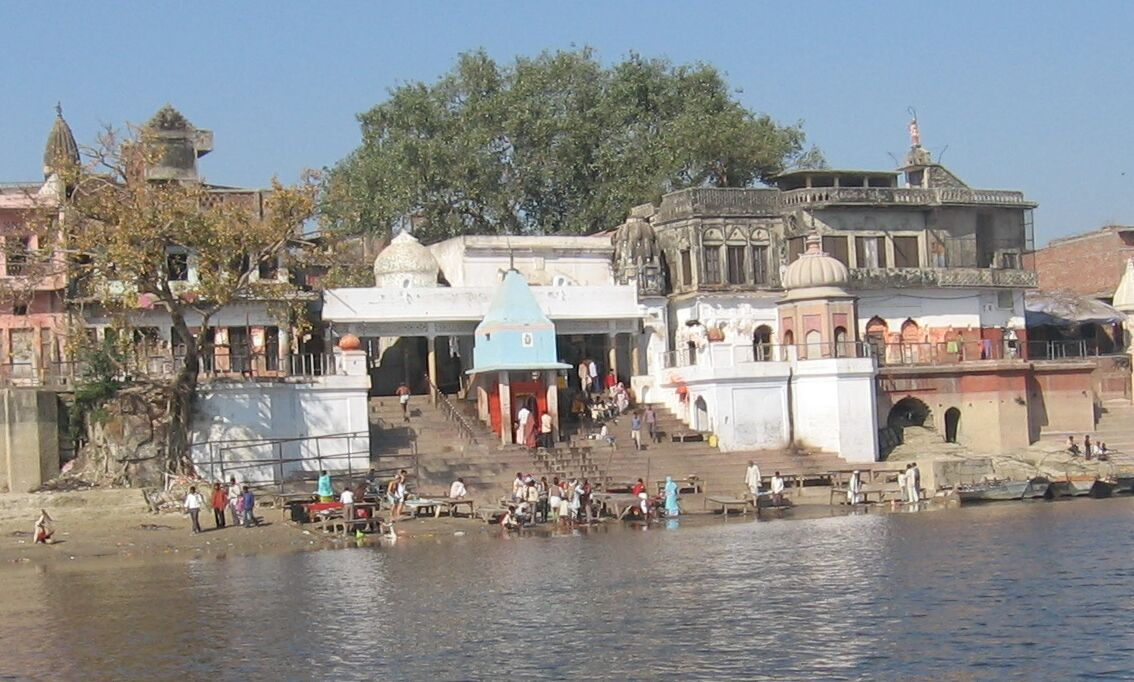
Kanpur attracts thousands of Hindu pilgrims every year.

Bithoor or Bithur is a town in Kanpur district, 23.4 kilometres (14.5 mi) by road north of the centre of Kanpur city, in Uttar Pradesh, India. Bithoor is situated on the right bank of the River Ganges, and is a centre of Hindu pilgrimage. Bithoor is also the centre for War of Independence of 1857 as Nana Sahib, a popular freedom fighter who was based there. The city is enlisted as a municipality of Kanpur metropolitan area.

=== Varanasi ===
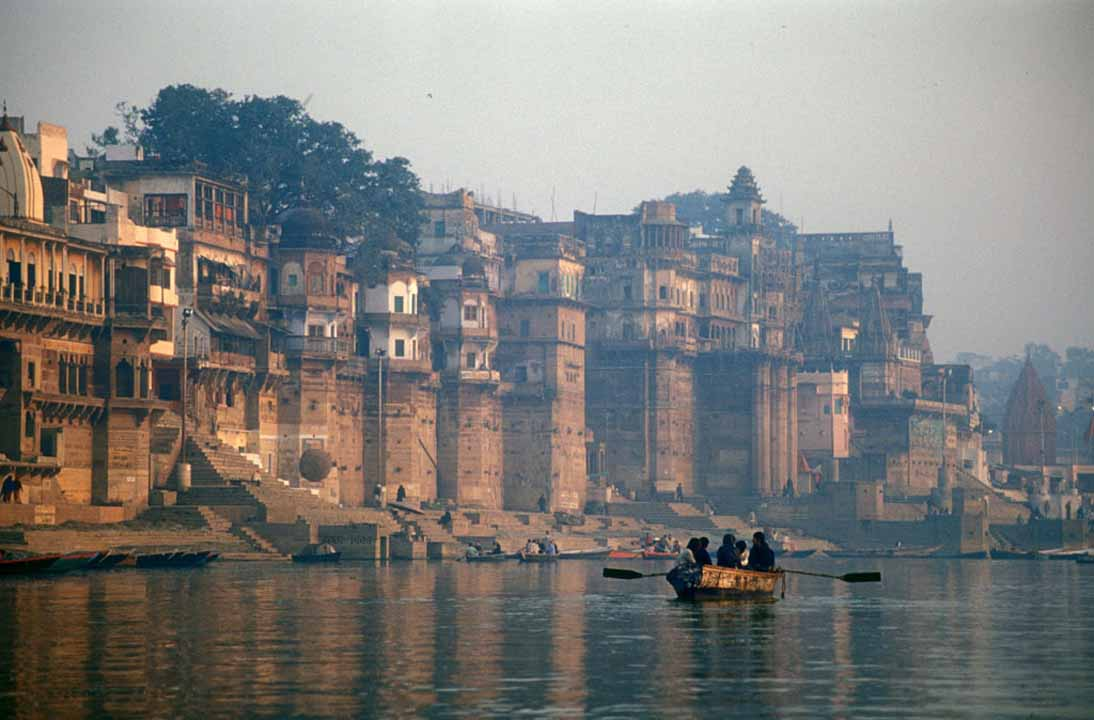
Varanasi attracts thousands of Hindu pilgrims every year.

Varanasi (also called Kashi and Benares) is widely considered to be the oldest city in the world, before Jerusalem. This spiritual place is famous for its ghats (steps along the river) which are populated year round with people who want to take a dip in the holy Ganges River.

Kashi Vishwanath Temple in Varanasi is home to the Vishwanath Jyotirling temple, which is one of the most sacred of Hindu Temples dedicated to lord Shiva.

Varanasi is famous for its banarasi sarees, cuisines, it includes food like diversity of sweets and all kinds of spicy food .

=== Mathura-Vrindavan ===
Birthplace of Lord Krishana. Both Mathura & Vrindavan have temples devoted to Krishna. During Holi, a special form of Holi called the Lath mar Holi is played here.

Janmaashtami, the birth of Lord Krishna, is celebrated in the region.

Mathura is one of the seven most important pilgrimage sites in Hindu religion. Vrindavan, another place related to Lord Shri Krishna, is said to be twin city of Mathura. There are about more than 25 ghats out of which Vishram Ghat is most sacred where Shri Krishna rested after killing Kansa.

=== Ayodhya ===
Hindus believe the birthplace of Lord Rama to be in Ayodhya at the place called Ram Janmabhoomi.

Ayodhya is also the birthplace of five Tirthankars, including the first Tirthankar of Jainism, Shri Rishabh Dev. He is known as the father of Jain religion. The city is also important in the history and heritage of Buddhism in India, with several Buddhist temples, monuments and centers of learning having been established here during the age of the Mauryan Empire and the Gupta Dynasty. Ayodhya reached its glorious peak as known to history during the reign of the Guptas over India.

Swaminarayan led the Swaminarayan Sampraday sect of Hinduism and lived here during his childhood years. It was from Ayodhya that Swaminarayan started his seven-year journey across India as Neelkanth.

Tulsidas is said to have begun the writing of his famous Ramayana poem Shri Ramacharitamanas in Ayodhya in 1574 CE. Several Tamil Alwar mention the city of Ayodhya. Ayodhya is also said to be the birthplace of Bahubali, Brahmi, Sundari, King Dasaratha, Acharya Padaliptasurisvarji, King Harishchandra, Shri Rama, Achalbhrata, and the ninth Gandhara of Mahavir Swami.

The Atharva Veda called Ayodhya "a city built by gods and being as prosperous as paradise itself".

Soron Shukar Kshetra is salvation land of Lord Varah and birthland of Sant Tulsidas.

Ayodhya is likely to get 5-6 crore people annually after the Ram Mandir construction is completed in 2023.

=== Naimisaranya ===
Naimisaranya also known as Neemsar, Nimsar or Nimkhar is a Hindu temple dedicated to Vishnu located in Sitapur district in the north Indian state of Uttar Pradesh. It is one of the Divya Desams, the 108 temples of Vishnu revered in Nalayira Divya Prabandham by the 12 poet saints, or Alwars. The temple is believed to be of significant antiquity with contributions at different times from the ruling kings. The temple is counted as one of the eight temples of Vishnu that self-manifested and is classified as Swayamvyaktha Kshetra. The holy tank Chankra Kunda is associated with the temple and it is a pilgrimage centre where people take a holy dip during festive occasions.

=== Prayagraj ===
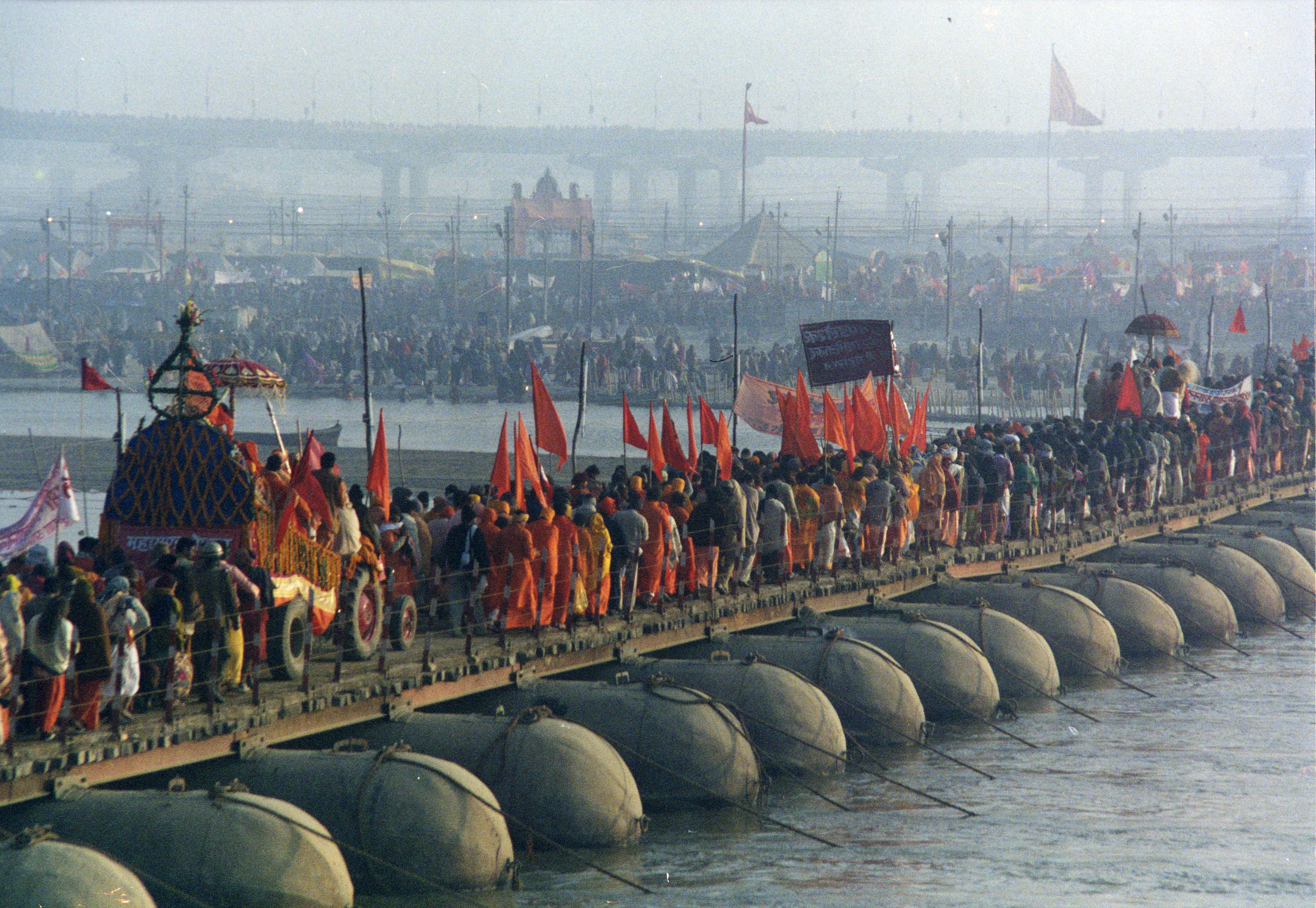
A procession of Akharas marching over a makeshift bridge over the Ganges river, Kumbh Mela at Prayagraj, 2001

Every year thousands gather at Prayagraj to take part in the festival on the banks of the Ganges, the Magh Mela. The same festival is organised in a larger scale every 12th year and attracts millions of people and is called the Kumbha Mela. Kumbh Mela (especially the Maha Kumbh Mela) is the most sacred of all the pilgrimages. Thousands of holy men and women (monks, saints and sadhus) attend, and the auspiciousness of the festival is in part attributable to this. The sadhus are seen clad in saffron sheets with plenty of ashes and powder dabbed on their skin per the requirements of ancient traditions. Some called Nanga sanyasis or Dhigambers may often be seen without any clothes even in severe winter, generally considered to live an extreme lifestyle. This tends to attract a lot of western attention as it is seemingly in contrast to a generally conservative social modesty practised in the country.

== Buddhist religious sites ==
Uttar Pradesh has many sites which are connected to Lord Buddha and hence, are sacred to Buddhist.

- Sarnath: a place where he held his first public discourse. Also at Sarnath is the Ashoka Pillar with the Lion Capital, is important archaeological artifact with national significance.
- Kushinagar: Where he attained Mahaparinirvana (Demise).
- Kaushambi: Where Buddha delivered many sermons.
- Sankassa: Where he descended after addressing his mother in Heaven.
- Sravasti: His favorite monsoon resort.

== Jain religious sites ==
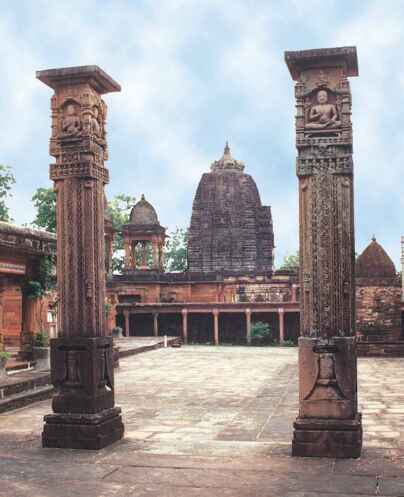
Shantinath Temple at Deogarh

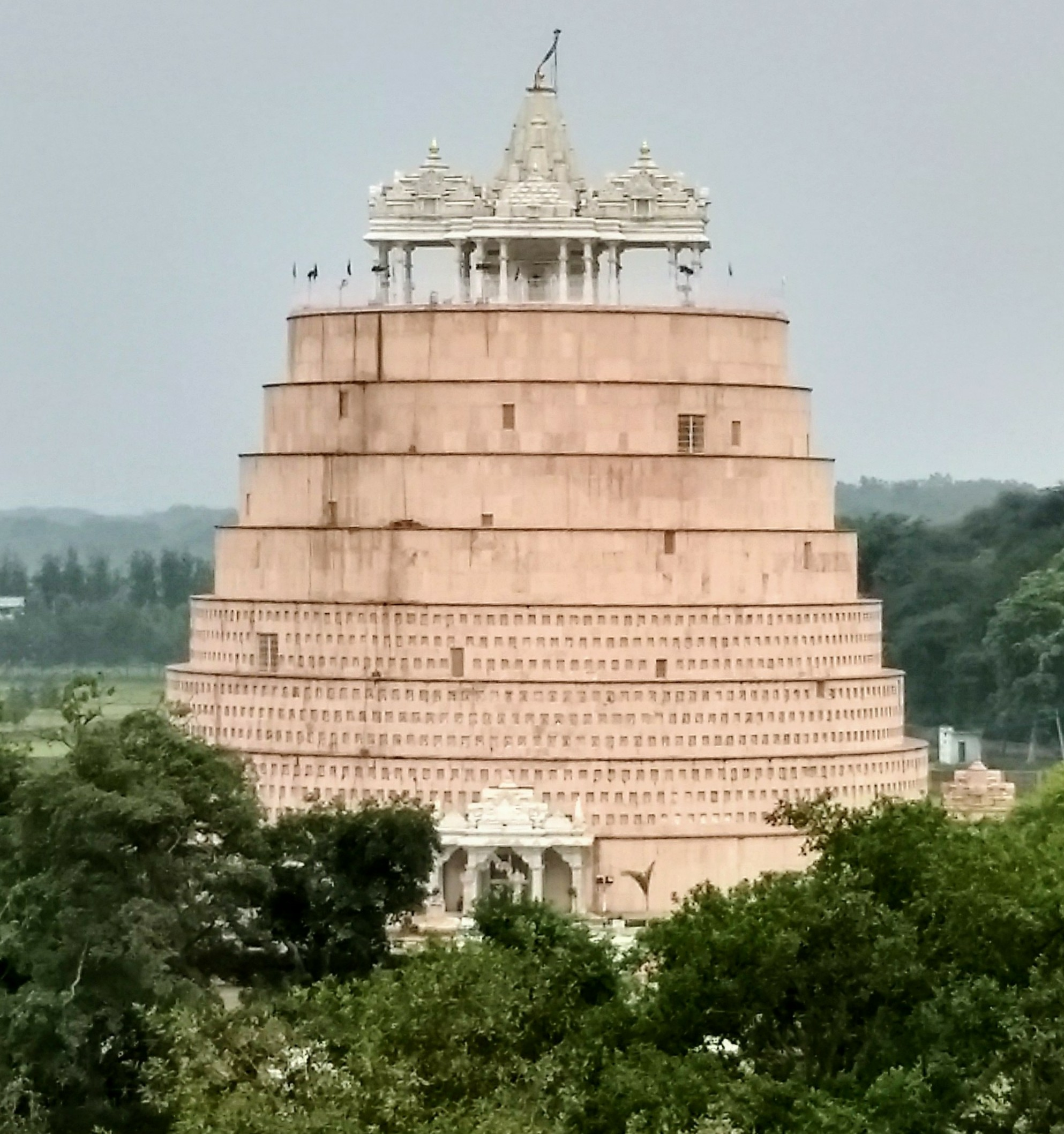
Ashtapad

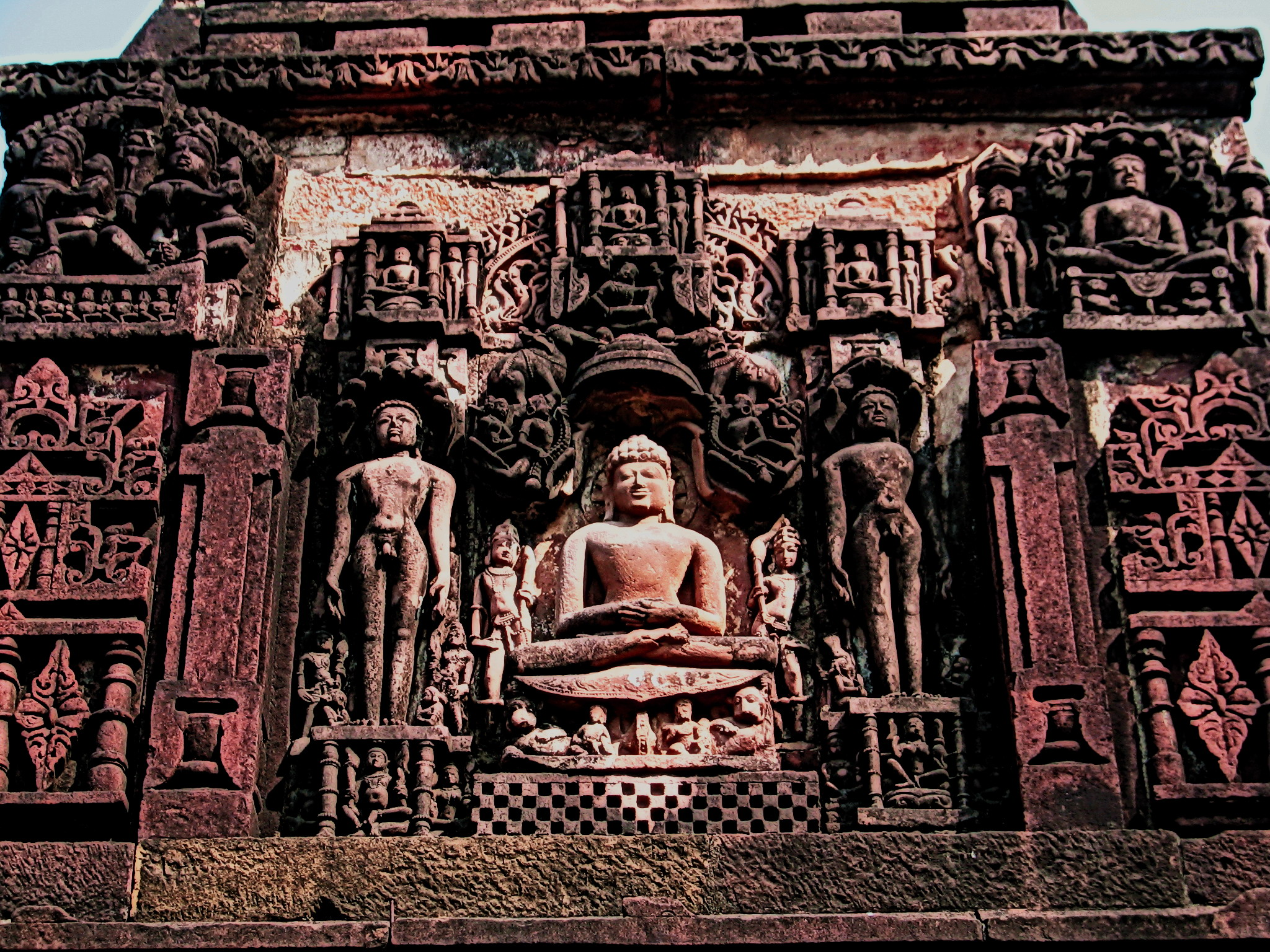
Carvings on wall of Shantinath temple, Deogarh

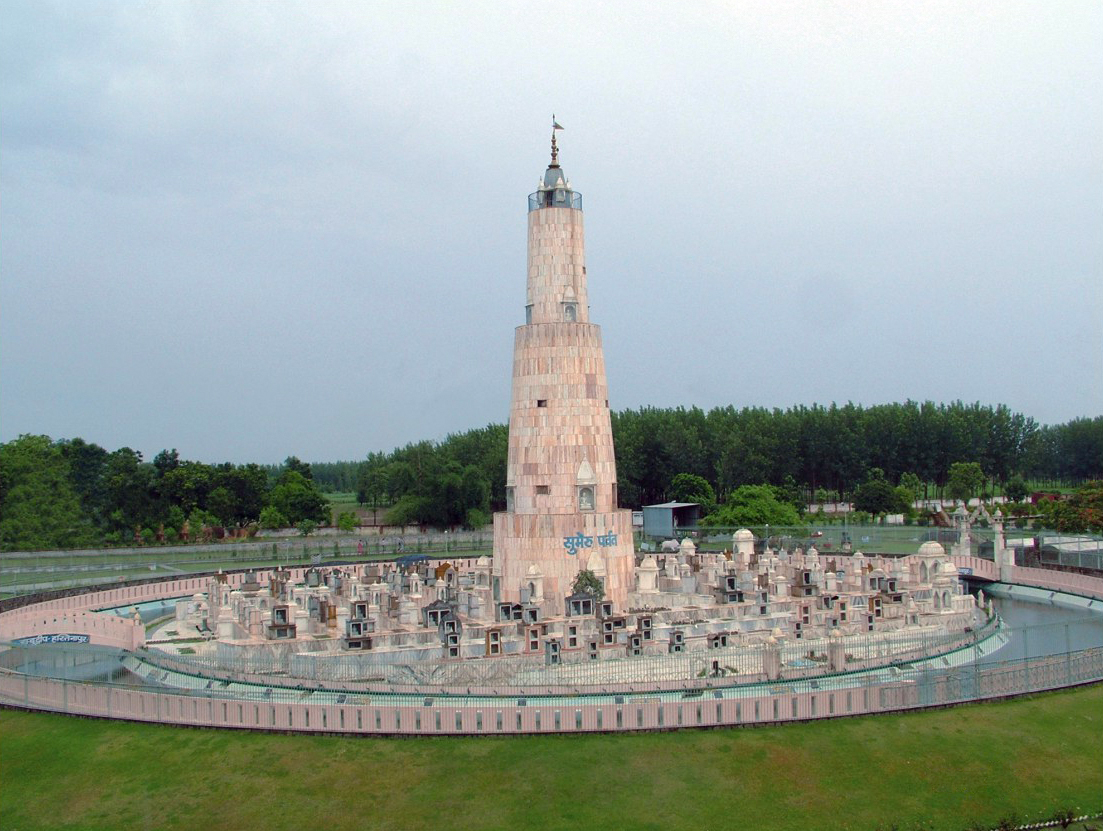
Jambudweep

Parshvanatha, the twenty-third Tirthankara, was born in Benaras (now Varanasi) in 872 BCE. According to Jain tradition, Kashi (now Varanasi) is the birthplace of three more Tirthankaras, namely Suparshvanatha, Chandraprabha and Shreyansanatha.

According to Jain tradition, five tirthankaras were born at Ayodhya, including Rishabhanatha, Ajitanatha, Abhinandananatha, Sumatinatha and Anantanatha.

Uttar Pradesh has many sites which are connected to Jainism and hence, are sacred to Jains.

- Jain temple, Deogarh is a complex of 31 Jain temples built inside fort belonging to 8th-9th century.
- Hastinapur is believed to be birthplace of Shantinatha, Kunthunatha and Aranatha.
- Ahichchhatra is place where Parshvanatha attained Kevala Jnana.
- Sarnath Jain Tirth is believed to be birthplace of Shreyansnath.
- Varansi is believed to be birthplace of Suparshvanatha and Parshvanatha.
- Shobhnath temple, Shravasti is believed to be birthplace of Sambhavanatha.
- Shouripur is believed to be birthplace of Neminatha.
- Bada Gaon
- Navagarh Tirth
- Bundelkhand, in the heart of India, has been an ancient centre of Jainism. It is mostly in modern Madhya Pradesh, but part of it is in Uttar Pradesh.

== Places of interest ==
Places of interest in Uttar Pradesh include:

- Varanasi – The origin of Hinduism and the oldest city of the world, also known as City of temples, holy place for devotees of Lord Shiva, one of the finest Textiles Industry in the world.
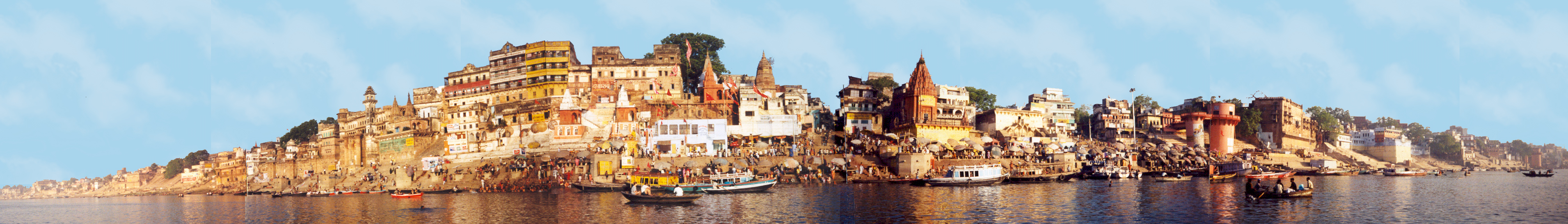
A view of the Ghat of Varanasi from the River Ganges
- Agra – Taj Mahal and several others historical monuments and gardens.
- Ambedkar Nagar - Historical places from ancient India to modern India and India's fastest growing Industrial city .
- Prayagraj – Well known for its Kumbh Mela. The place where Indian national river Ganges and Yamuna and Saraswati rivers meet. A mass Hindu pilgrimage in which Hindus gather at the Ganges river. Akbar forts, one of the most popular religious center of ancient and modern India for Hinduism. Uttar Pradesh's administrative and education capital.

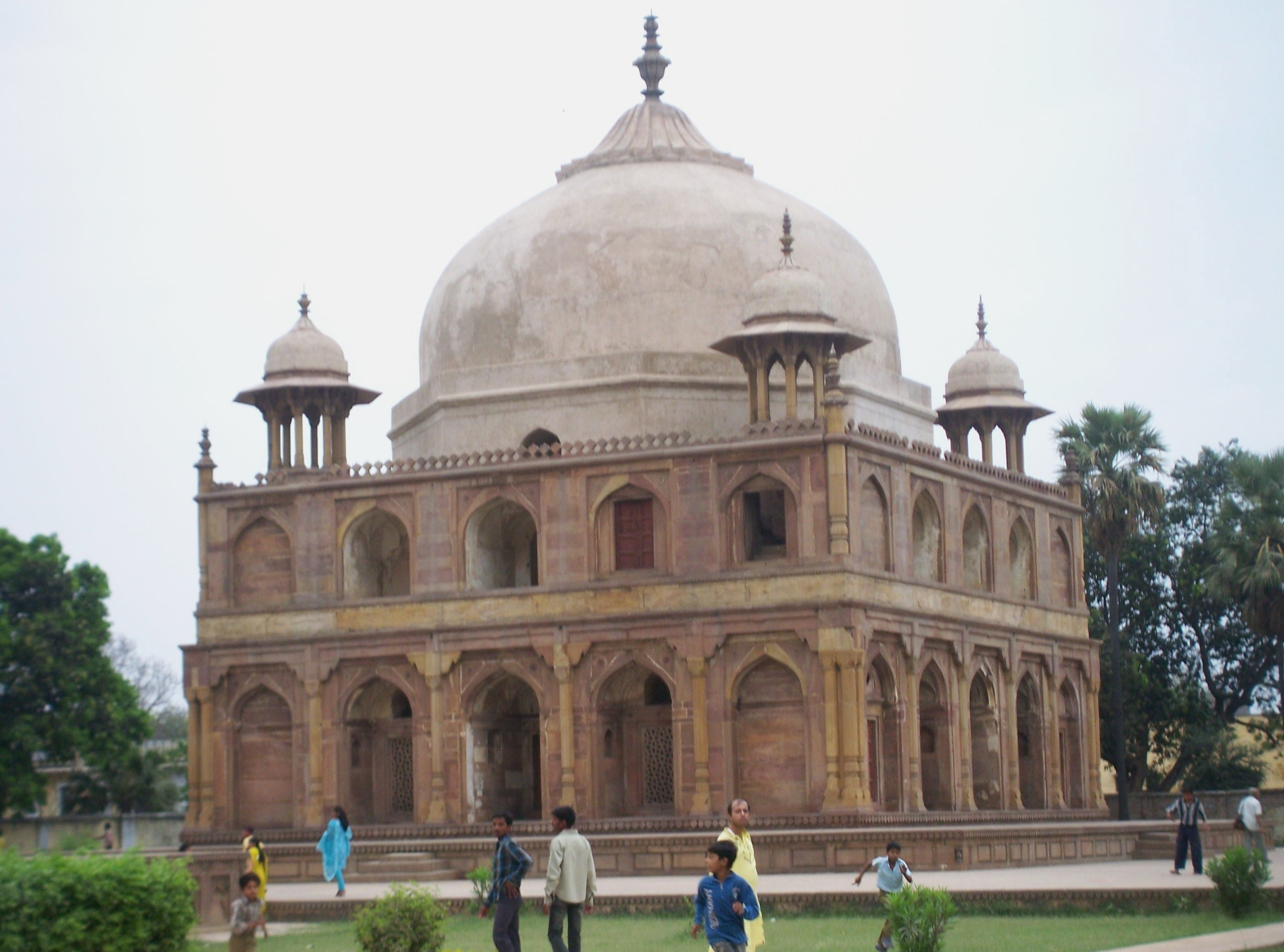
The tomb of Khusrau Mirza in Khusro Bagh, Prayagraj

- Allahabad museum - is a National-level museum in Prayagraj Uttar Pradesh
- Kanpur – Uttar Pradesh's commercial and Industrial hub, several historical places from British era like Kanpur Memorial Church and an ancient brick temple at Bhitargaon.

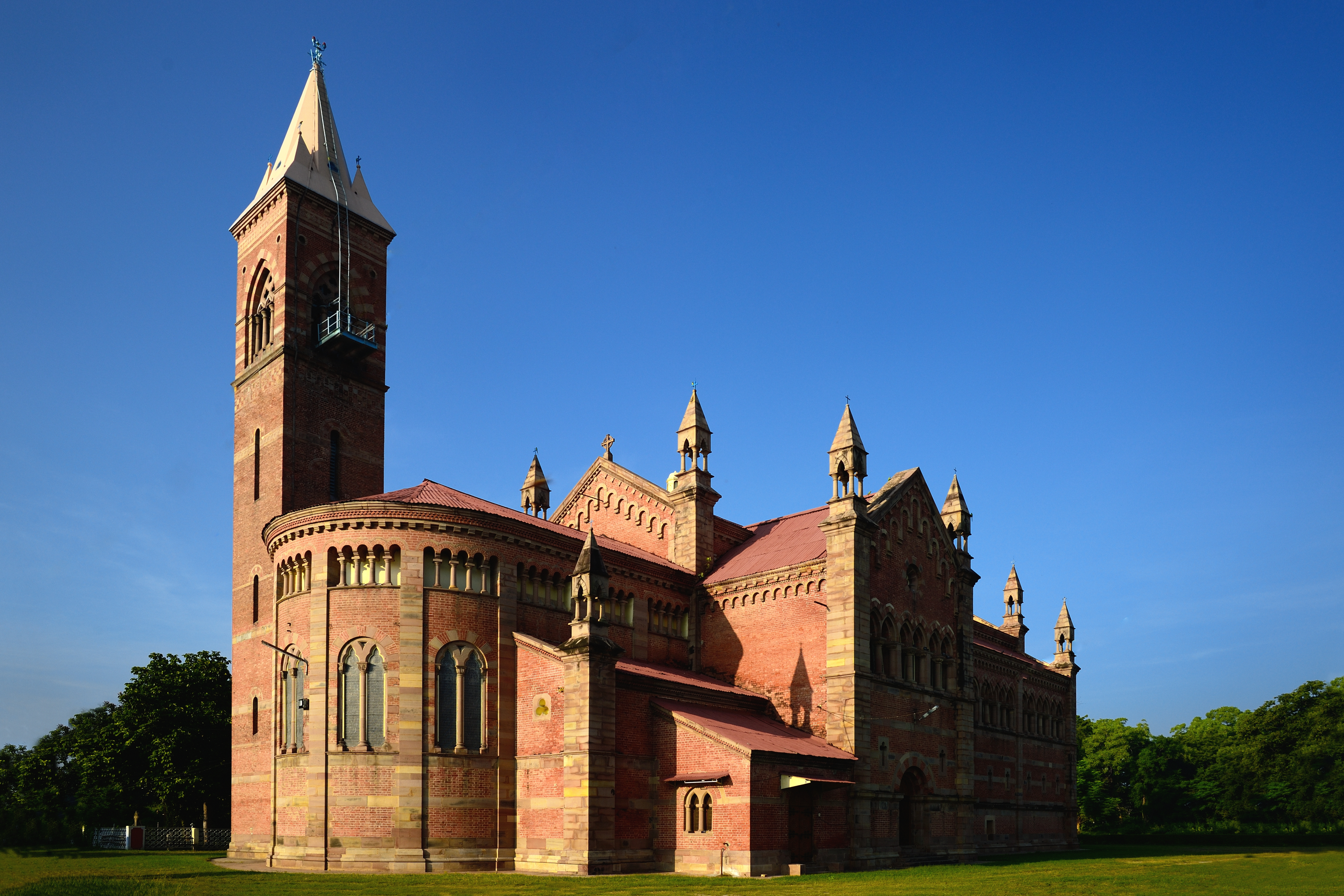
Kanpur Memorial Church.

- Lucknow – The capital of Uttar Pradesh, Several historical places Nawab, British and ancient India.
- Mathura-Vrindavan-The birthplace of Lord Krishna of Hinduism and Neminath of Jainism.
- Ayodhya – The birthplace of Lord Vishnu's incarnation prabhu Shri Rama.
- Jhansi – Historical place, Rani Lakshmibai's battlefield against British, Jhansi Fort.
- Pilibhit Tiger Reserve - 45th tiger reserve of India, won international award for doubling tiger count before target.
- Bareilly—A large city of Uttar Pradesh with many attractions such as Banke Bihari Temple, Hari Temple, Ala Hazrat, and Gandhi Udhayan. The jhumka style of music is associated with Bareilly.
- Sarnath-Gautama Buddha first taught the Dharma, the Buddha as one of the four places of pilgrimage which his devout followers should visit. The birthplace of Shreyansanath, the eleventh Jain Tirthankar of the Jainism.
- Kushinagar – It is an important Buddhist pilgrimage site, where Gautama Buddha is believed to have attained Parinirvana after his death.
- Fatehpur Sikri-Historical place for Mughal Empire's palaces and forts.

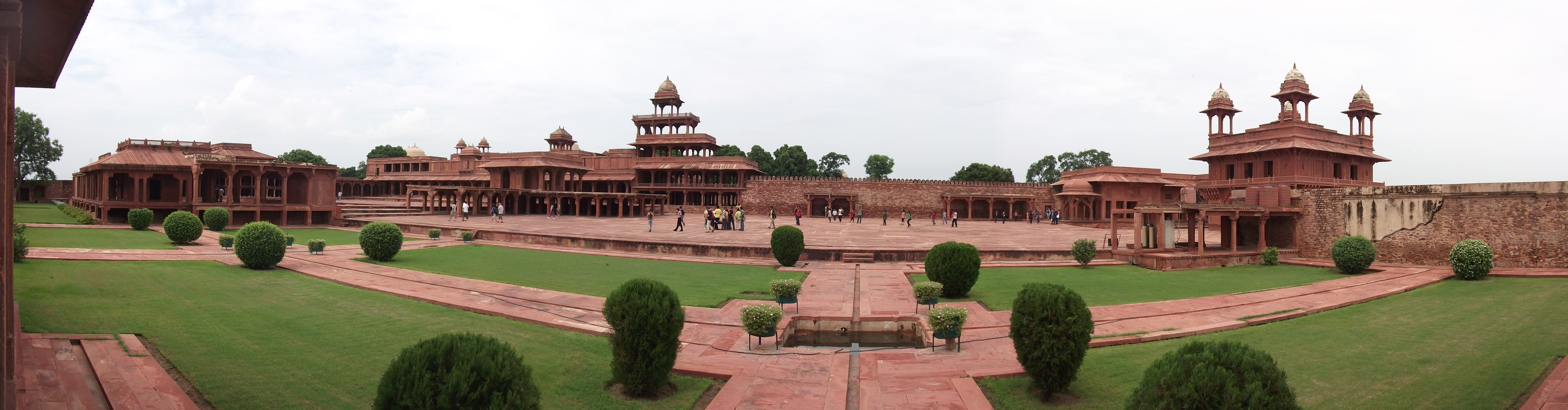
A panoramic view of the Fatehpur Sikri Palace, Uttar Pradesh

- Meerut – The historical place of the Sepoy Mutiny of 1857 or the First War of Indian Independence. Indian Historical place from Mahabharata period of ancient India to Modern Uttar Pradesh, India.
- Mirzapur – Mirzapur is famous for its carpet and brassware industries, its rich spiritual and historical sites like the Vindhyavasini Temple and Chunar Fort, and its folk traditions such as the Kajari festival. The city is also known for its natural beauty, including waterfalls and the Vindhya Hills. Moreover Mirzapur also tells time to whole India as Indian Standard Time (IST) is calculated on the basis of 82.5 degrees east longitude from the clock tower which is in Mirzapur.
- Ghaziabad – Historical places from ancient India to modern India and India's fastest growing Industrial city .
- Noida and Greater Noida – IT, Electronics and education hub of Northern India.India's biggest city with planned and iconic skyscrapers.
- Gorakhpur – The city was home to Buddhist, Hindu, Muslim, Jain and Sikh saints. The birthplace of Paramhansa Yogananda, great Hindu emperor Chandragupta Maurya. Gorakhpur is famous for Gorakhnath Temple (Gorakshnath Math), Chauri Chaura, Geeta press, Gita Vatika, Ramgarh Tal Lake, and is one of the fastest-growing cities in Uttar Pradesh.
- Jaunpur – Historical city founded by the Sultan of Delhi, Feroz Shah Tughlaq and named in memory of his father, Muhammad bin Tughluq as Jaunpur Sultanate. Mughals, Lodis and Islamic forts.
- Dudhwa National Park – Dudhwa Tiger Reserve, Birds Sanctuary, the unique Frog Temple at Oyal, Surat Bhawan Palace, Elephant Rides.
- Rehar – Several major tourist attractions can be mentioned in the town's surroundings, like Jim Corbett National Park (India) about 24 km, Nainital (India) about 69 km
- Gonda - Mulagandhakuti. The remains of Buddha's hut in Jetavana Monastery, Sravasti in Gonda Division and Swaminarayan Chhapaiyā: The village of Chhapaiya is situated at a distance of 50 km from the district headquarters. The chief interest of the place is Swaminarayan temple which marks the birthplace of Swaminarayan, or Sahajanand Swami, who was born here on 2 April 1781 as Ghanshyam Pande. Ghanshyam left Chhapaiya at the age of 11 to travel to the pilgrimage sites around India. He completed his pilgrimage in Western Gujarat, where he assumed the leadership of Swaminarayan Sampradaya. The Akshardham temples in New Delhi and in Gandhinagar, Gujarat built by his spiritual successor, Pramukh Swami Maharaj, are both dedicated to him. His followers consider him to be a manifestation of the Supreme Godhead.[10] There have been many movies about the Swaminarayan filmed in this temple in Chhapaiya and in nearby places in the district.

== Dudhwa National Park ==
Dudhwa National Park is a national park in the Terai belt of marshy grasslands in northern Uttar Pradesh, India. It stretches over an area of 490.3 km^{2} (189.3 sq mi), with a buffer zone of 190 km^{2} (73 sq mi). It is part of the Dudhwa Tiger Reserve in the Lakhimpur Kheri district.

== Dudhwa Tiger Reserve ==
The Dudhwa Tiger Reserve is a protected area in Uttar Pradesh that stretches mainly across the Lakhimpur Kheri and Bahraich districts and comprises the Dudhwa National Park, Kishanpur Wildlife Sanctuary and Katarniaghat Wildlife Sanctuary. It covers an area of 1,284.3 km^{2} (495.9 sq mi). Three large forested areas are extant within the reserve, although most of the surrounding landscape is agricultural. It shares the north-eastern boundary with Nepal, which is defined to a large extent by the Mohana River. It ranges in altitude from 110 to 185 m (361 to 607 ft), and several streams flow through the reserve from the northwest across the alluvial plain that encompasses the reserve.

=== Pilibhit Tiger Reserve ===
Pilibhit Tiger Reserve is a tiger reserve located in Pilibhit district of Uttar Pradesh, which was notified as a tiger reserve in 2014. It forms part of the Terai Arc Landscape in the upper Gangetic Plain along the India-Nepal border. The habitat is characterised by sal forests, tall grasslands and swamp maintained by periodic flooding from rivers. The Sharda Sagar Dam extending up to a length of 22 km (14 mi) is on the boundary of the reserve.

Pilibhit is one of the few well-forested districts in Uttar Pradesh. According to an estimate of the year 2018, Pilibhit district has over 800 km^{2} (310 sq mi) forests, constituting roughly 23% of the district’s total area. Forests in Pilibhit have at least 65 tiger and a prey including five species of deer. The tiger reserve got the first International award TX2 for doubling the tiger population in a stipulated time.

== Galleries ==
=== Agra ===
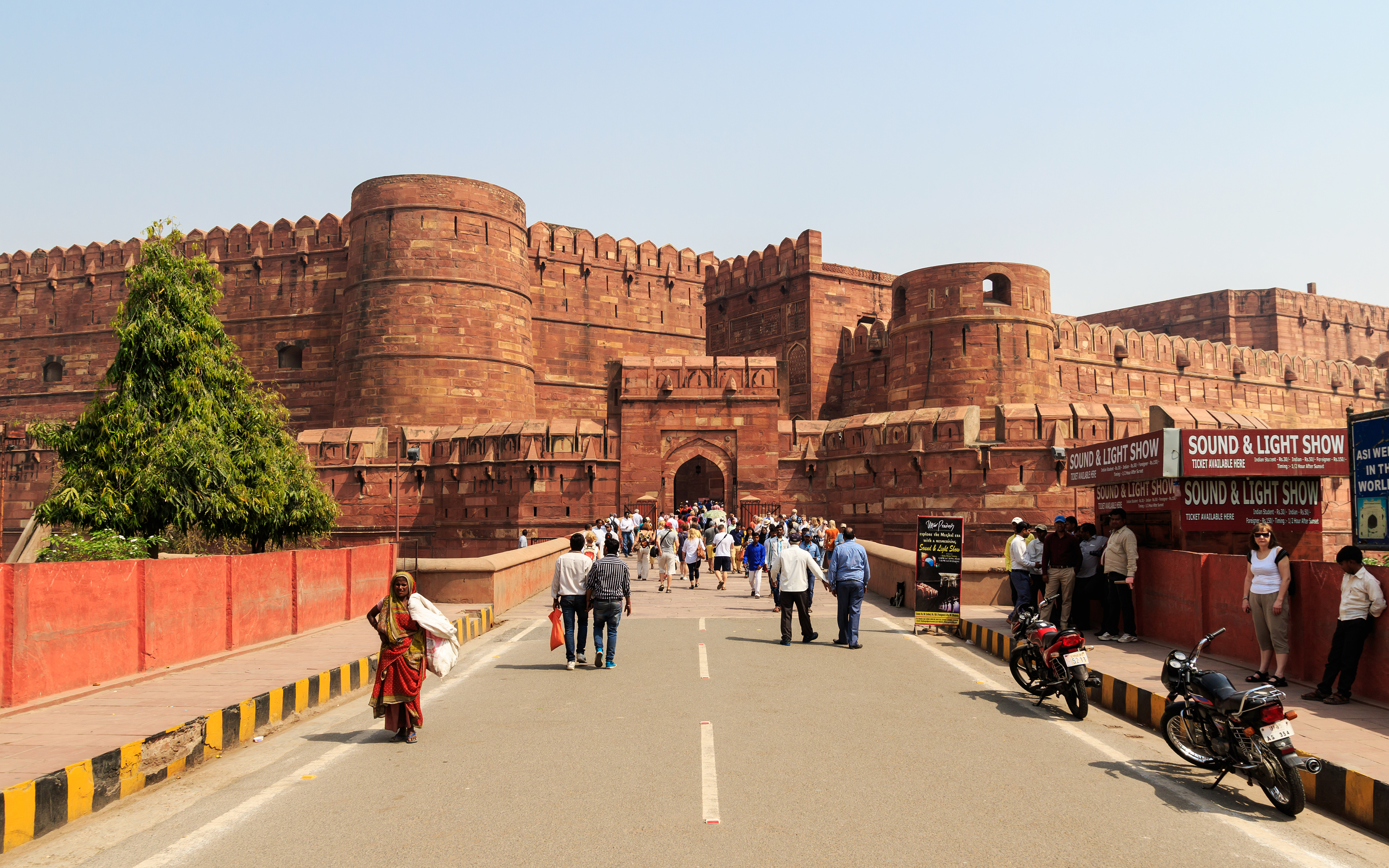
Agra Fort

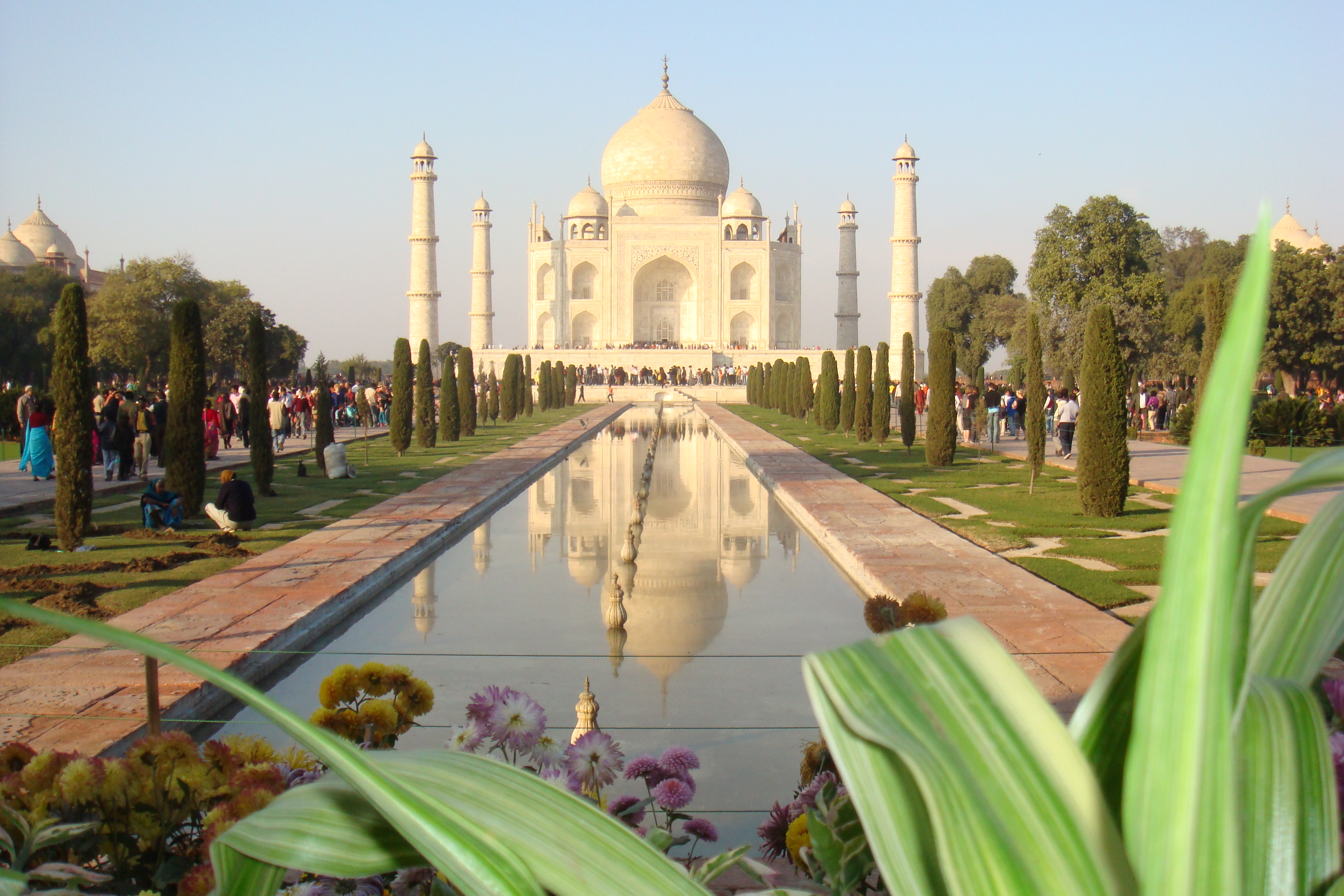
Taj Mahal

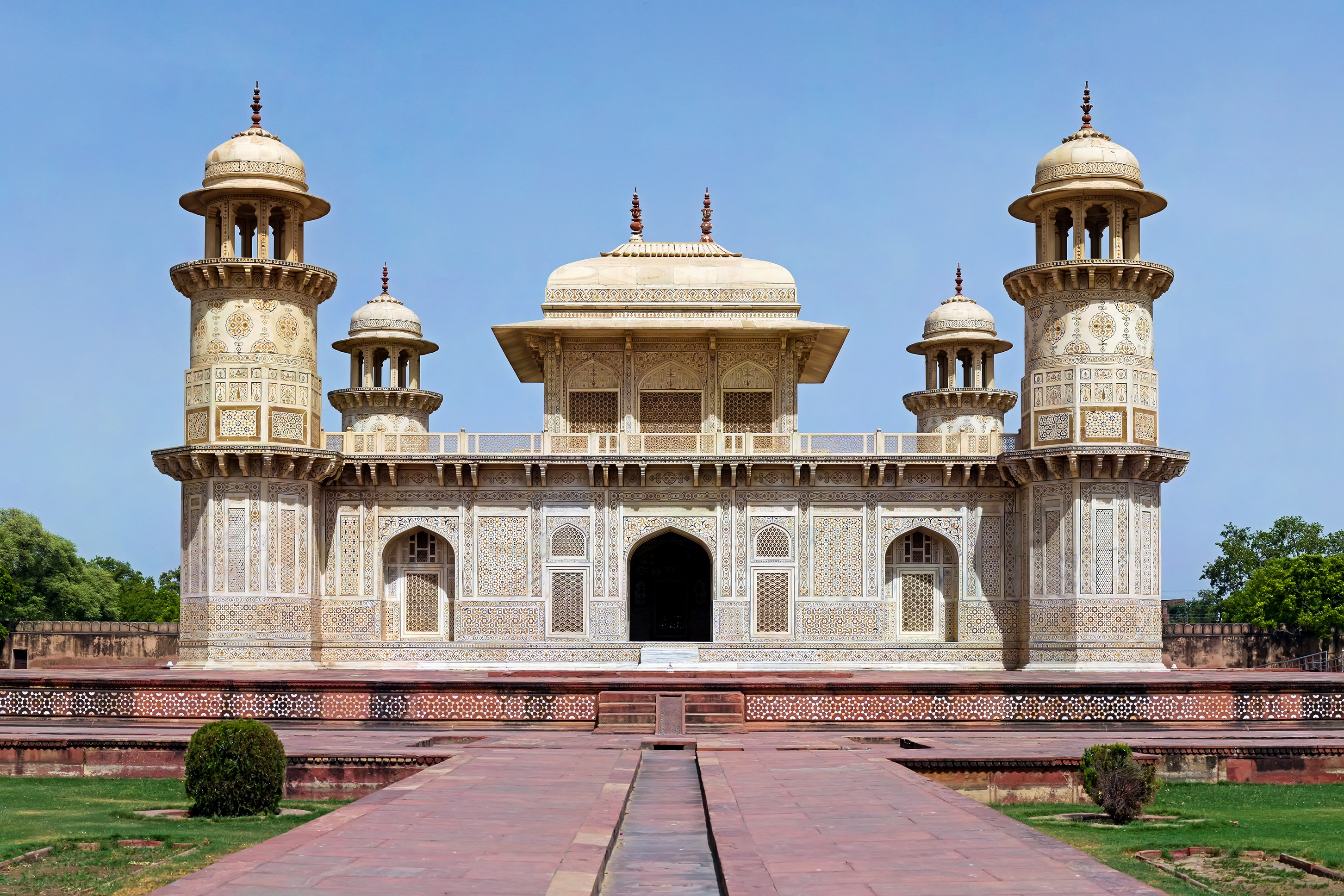
Tomb of I'timād-ud-Daulah

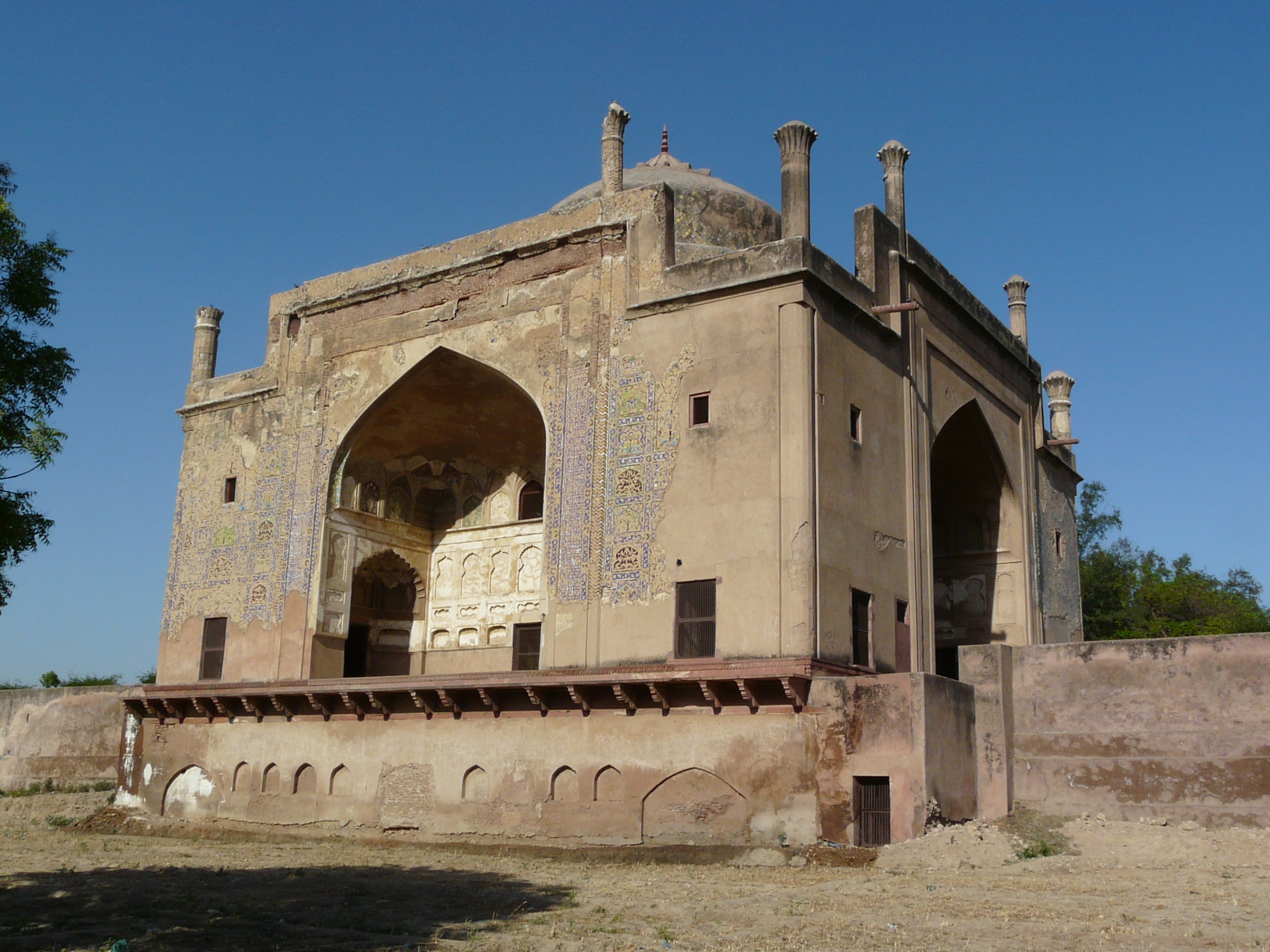
Chini Ka Rauza

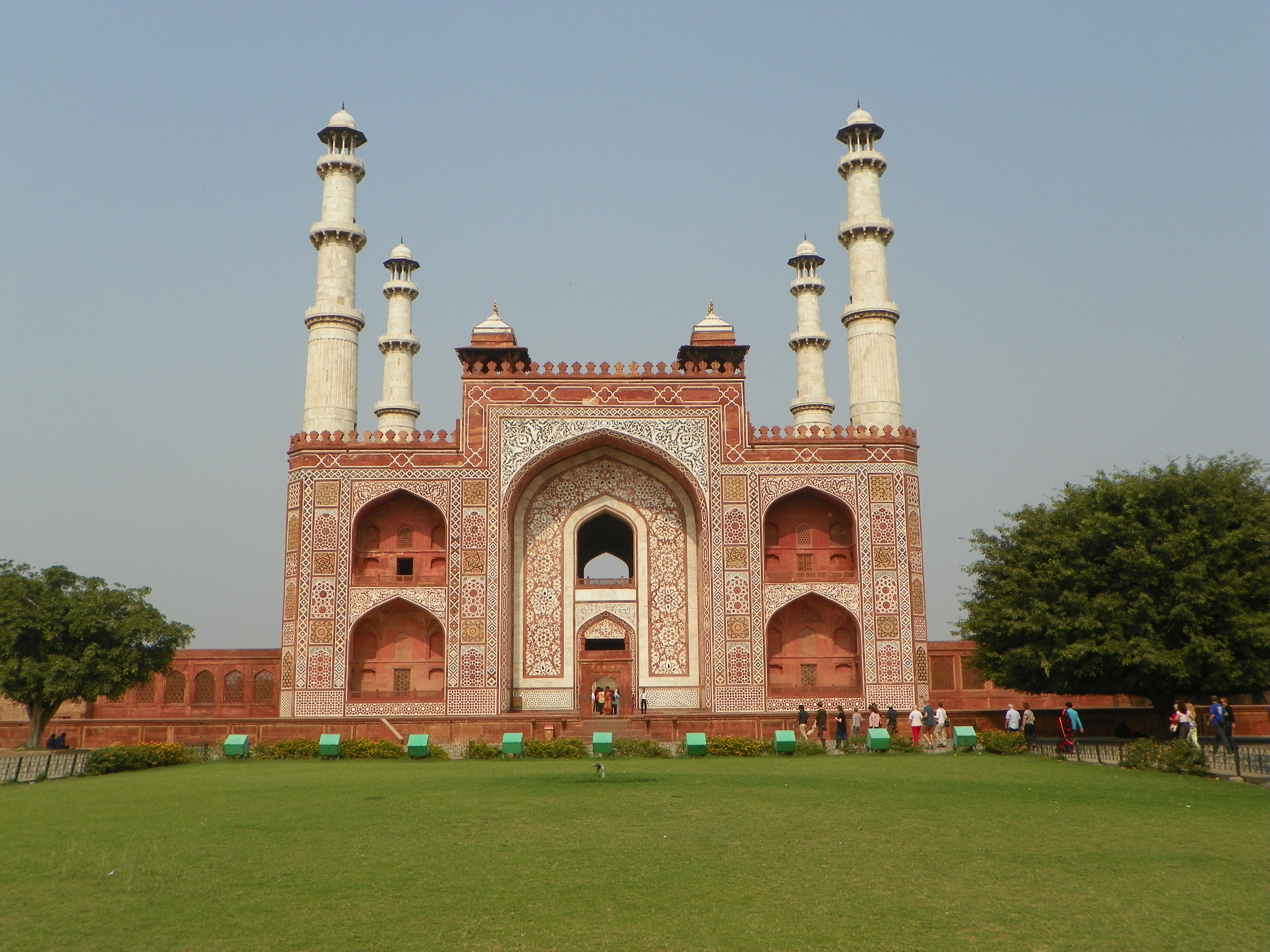
Akbar's Tomb

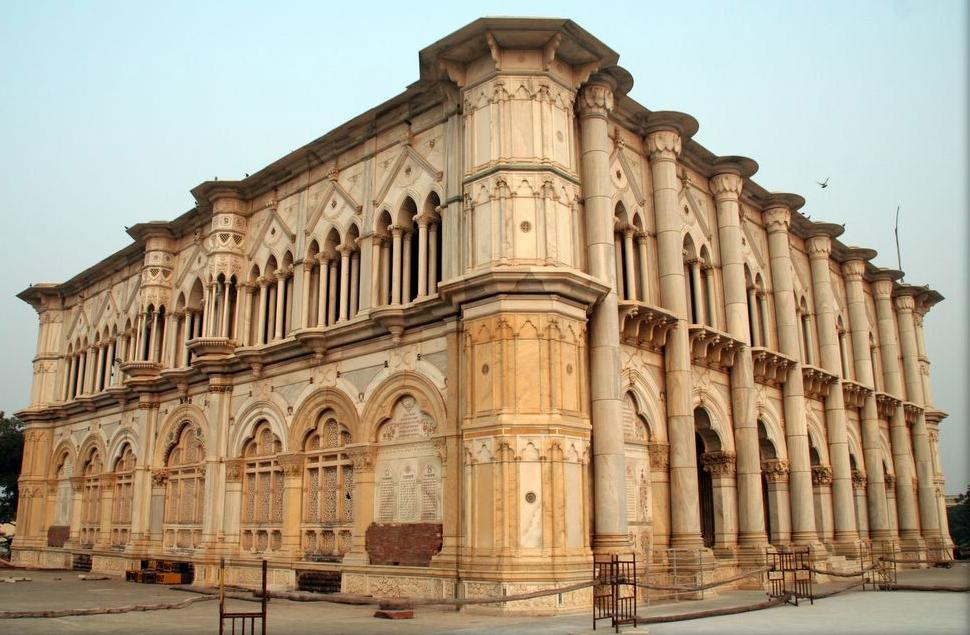
Soami Bagh Samadh, in Dayalbagh.

=== Prayagraj ===
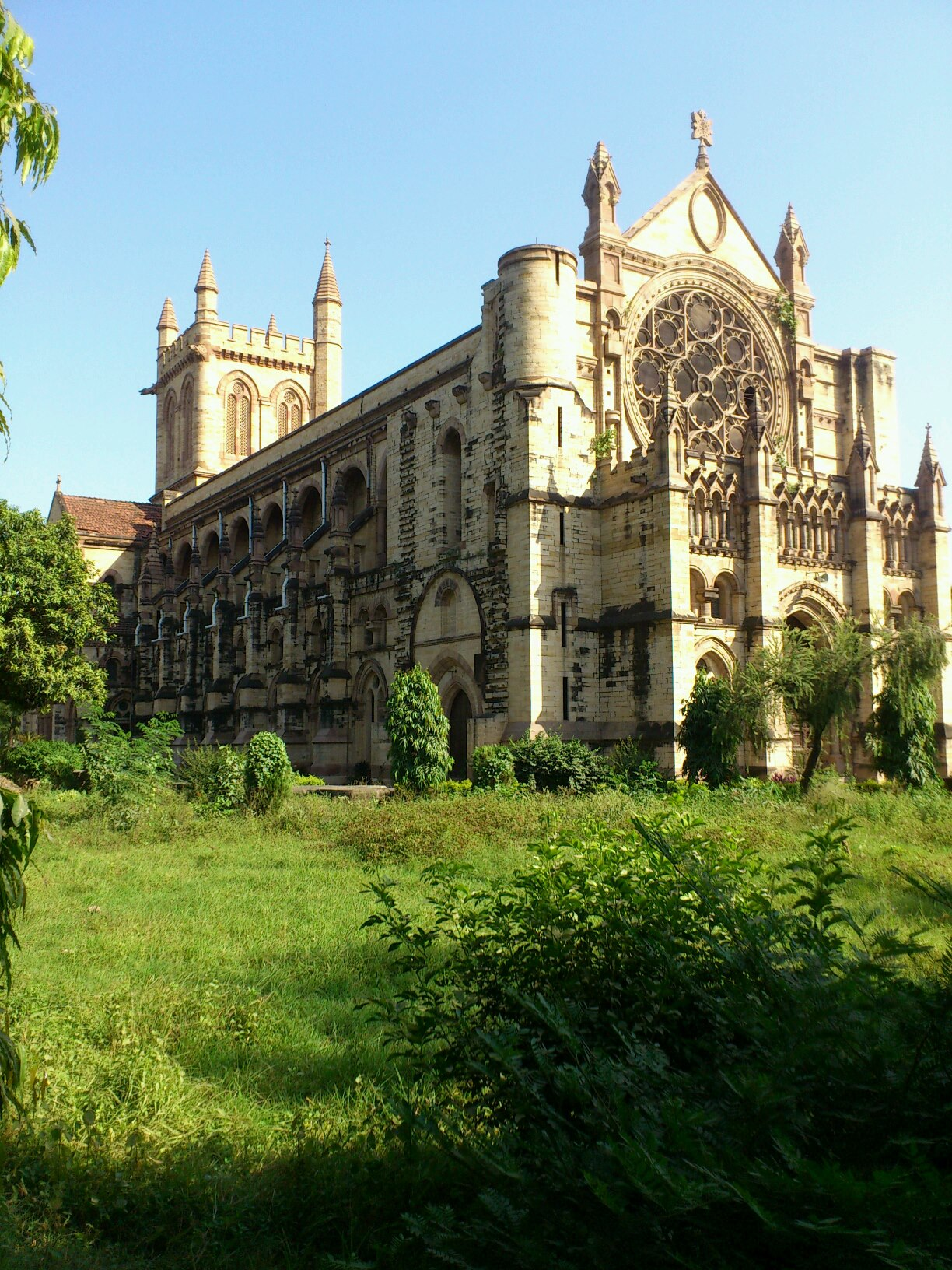
All Saints Cathedral

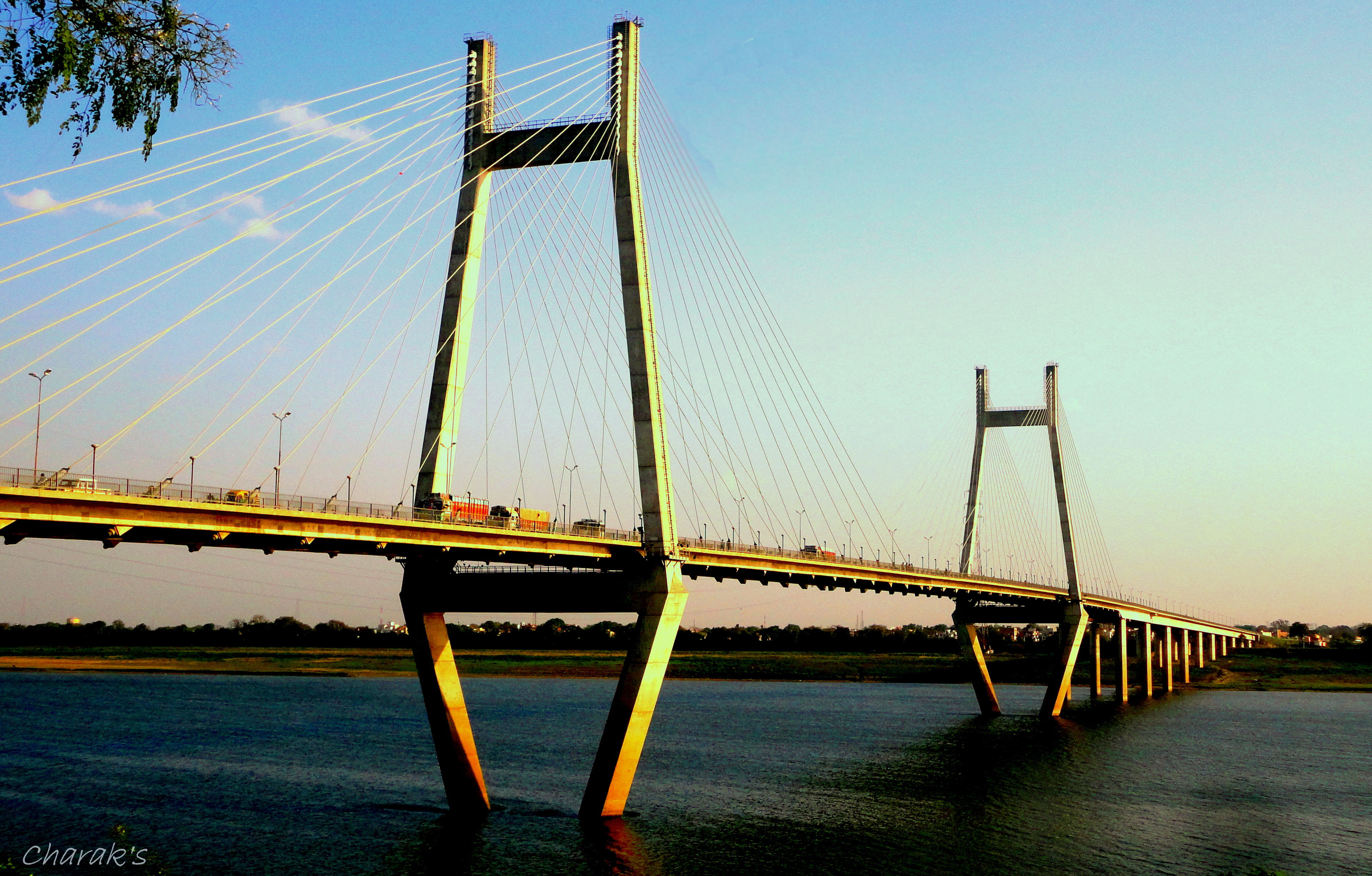
The New Yamuna Bridge

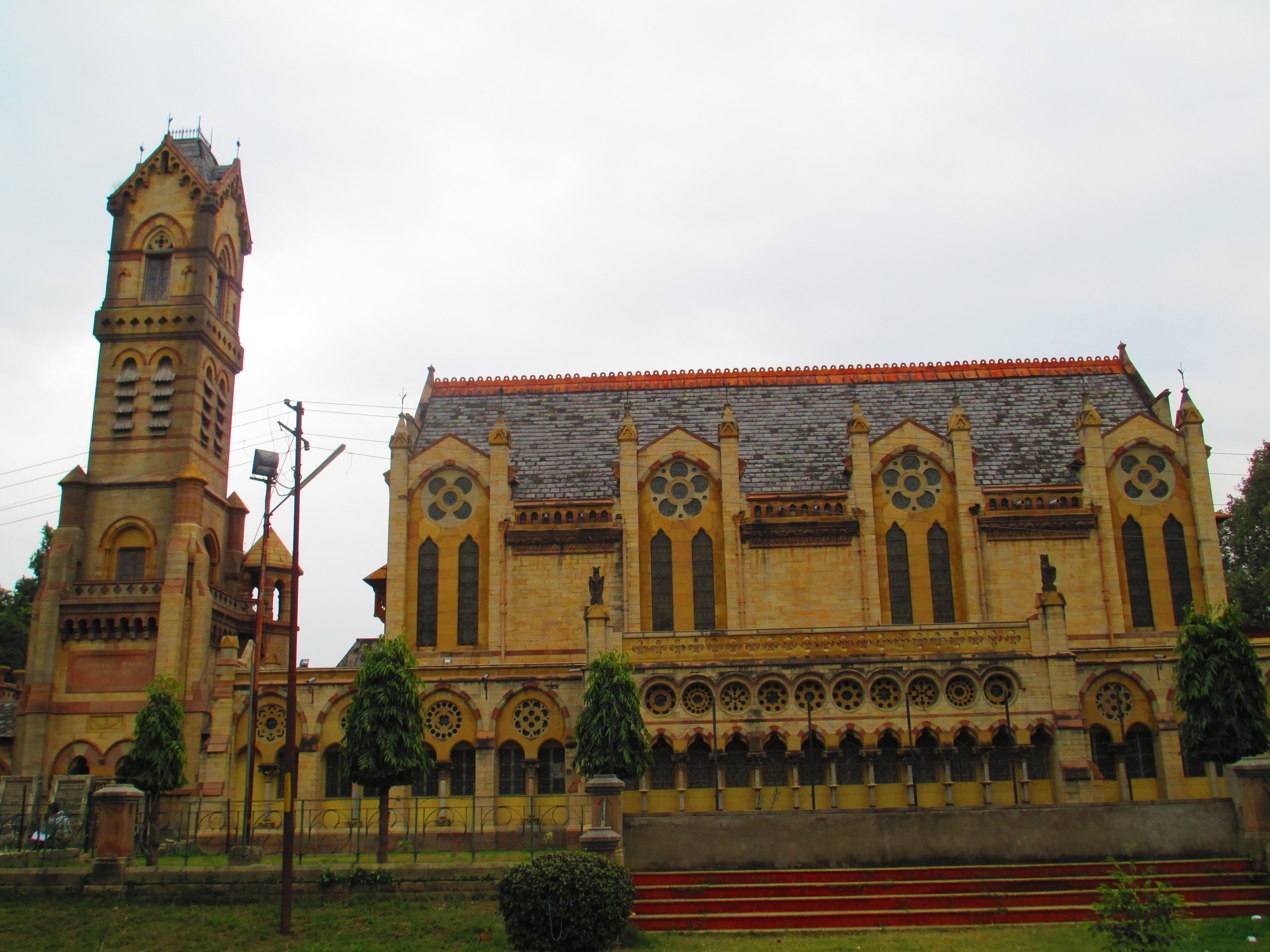
Thornhill Mayne Memorial

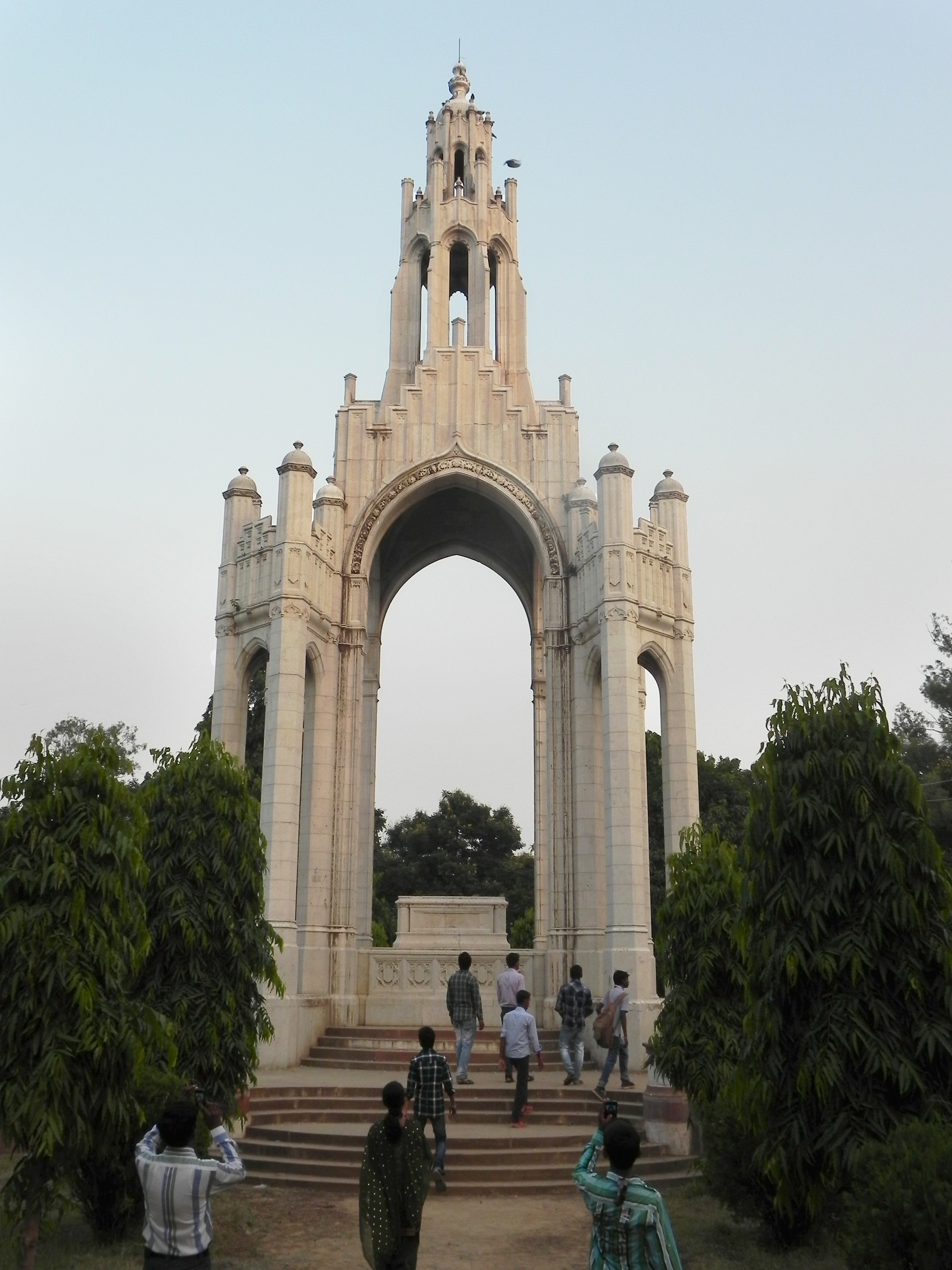
Victoria Memorial at Alfred Park

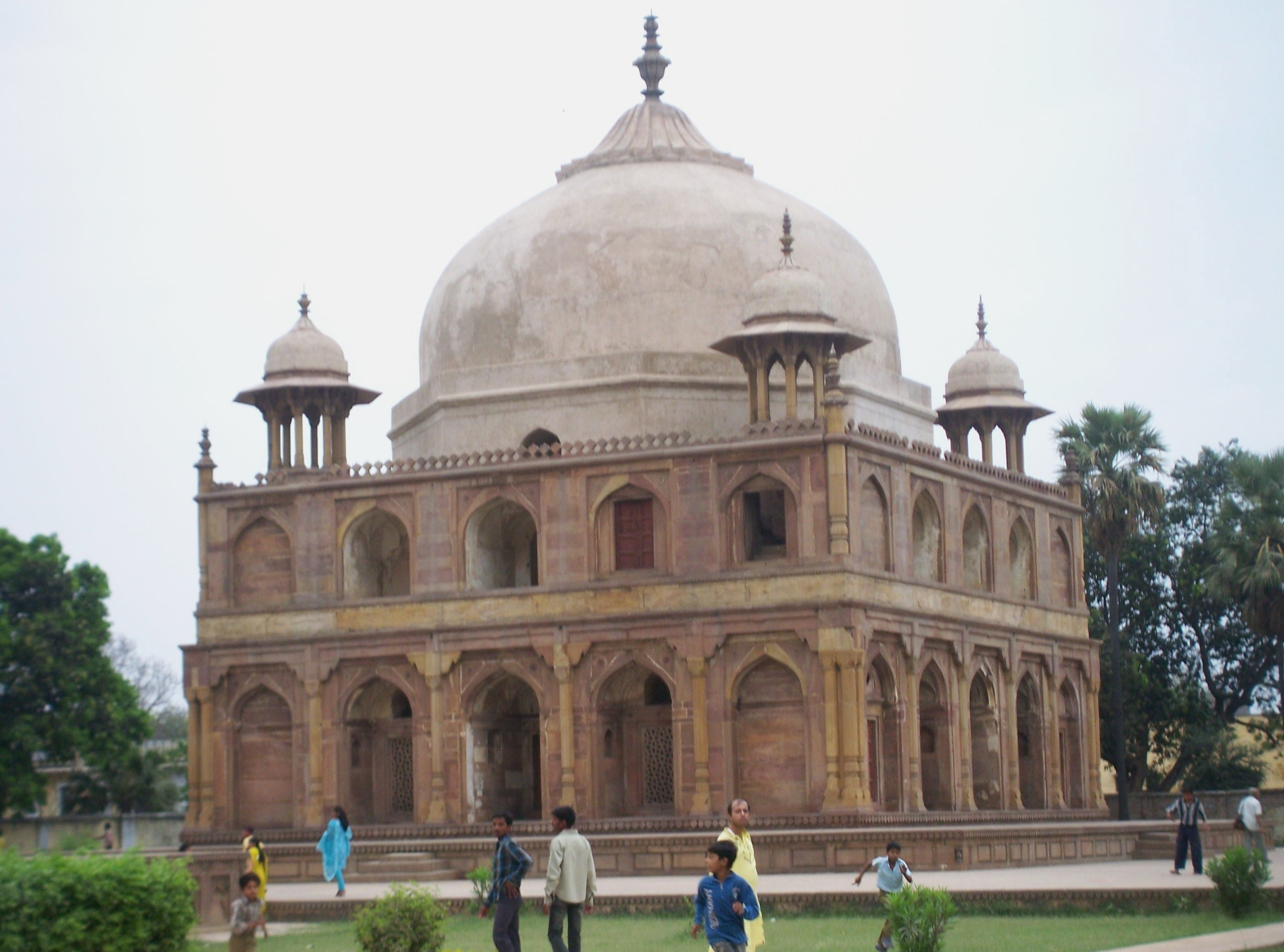
Khusro Bagh

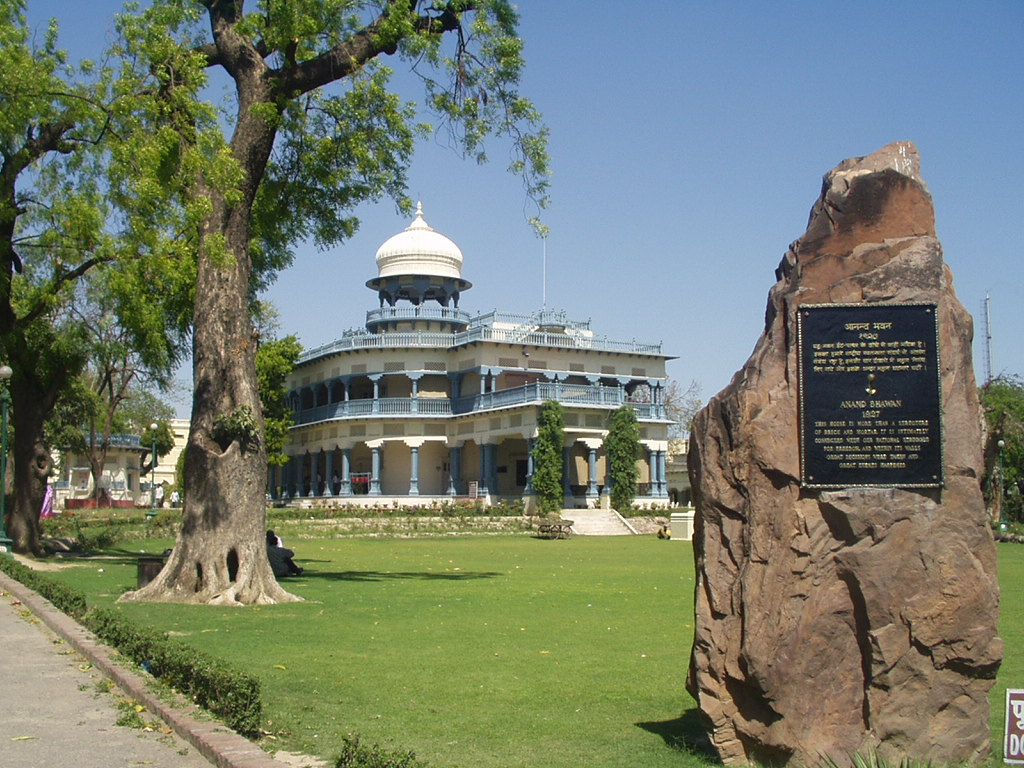
Anand Bhavan

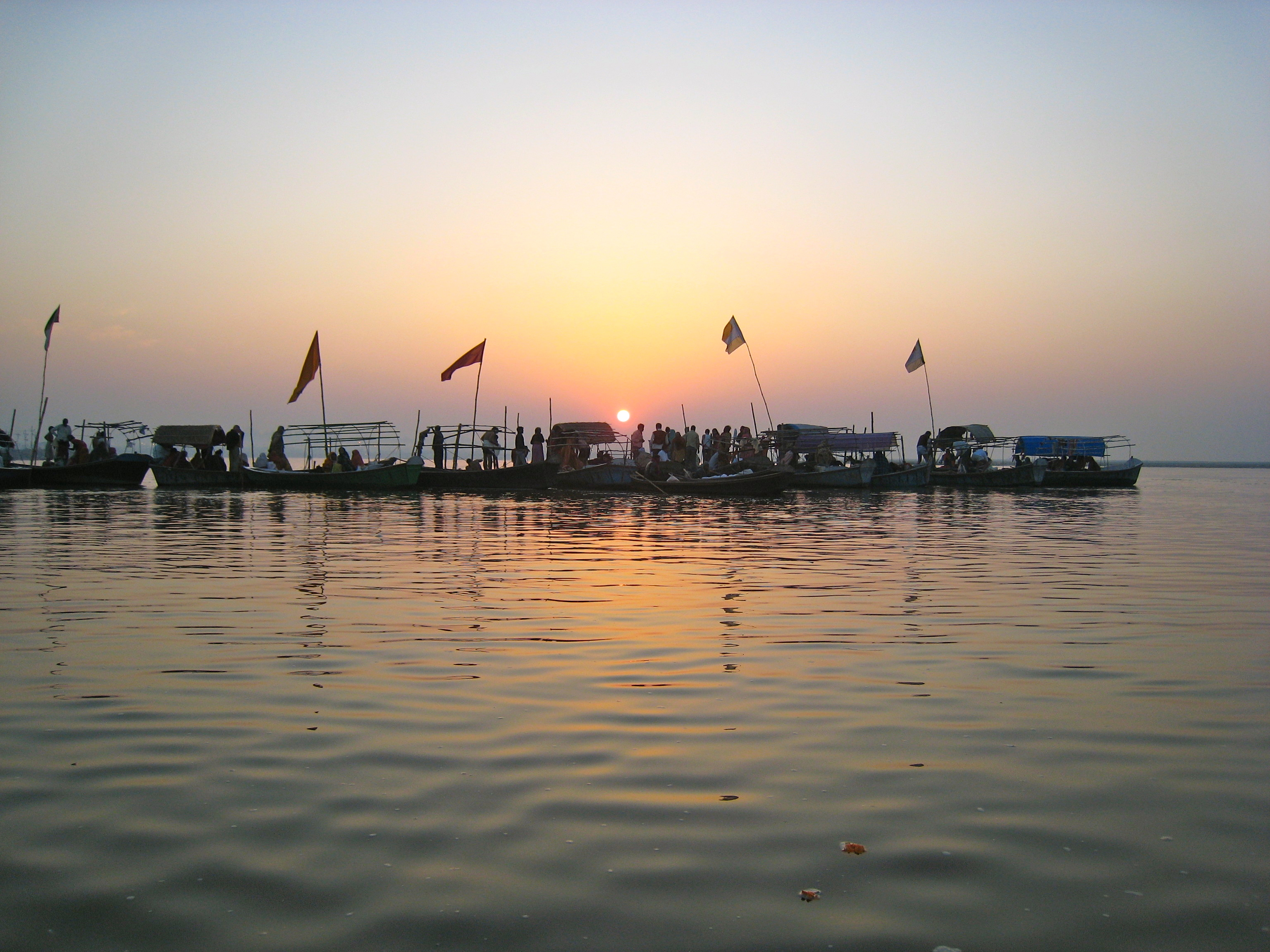
Sangam, the site of Kumbh Mela

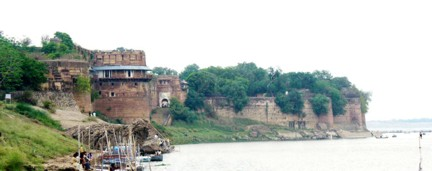
Allahabad Fort

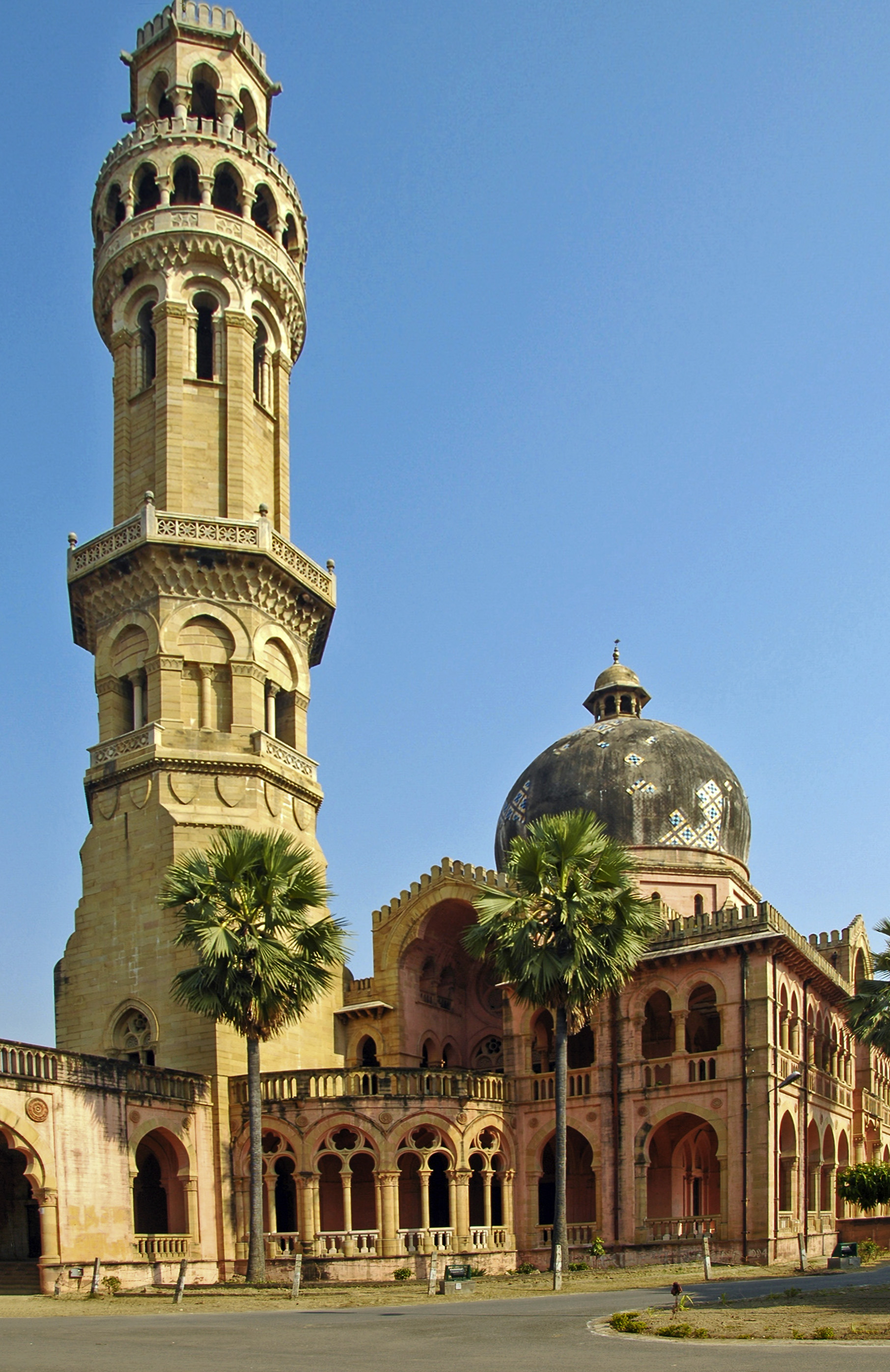
Allahabad University

=== Ayodhya ===
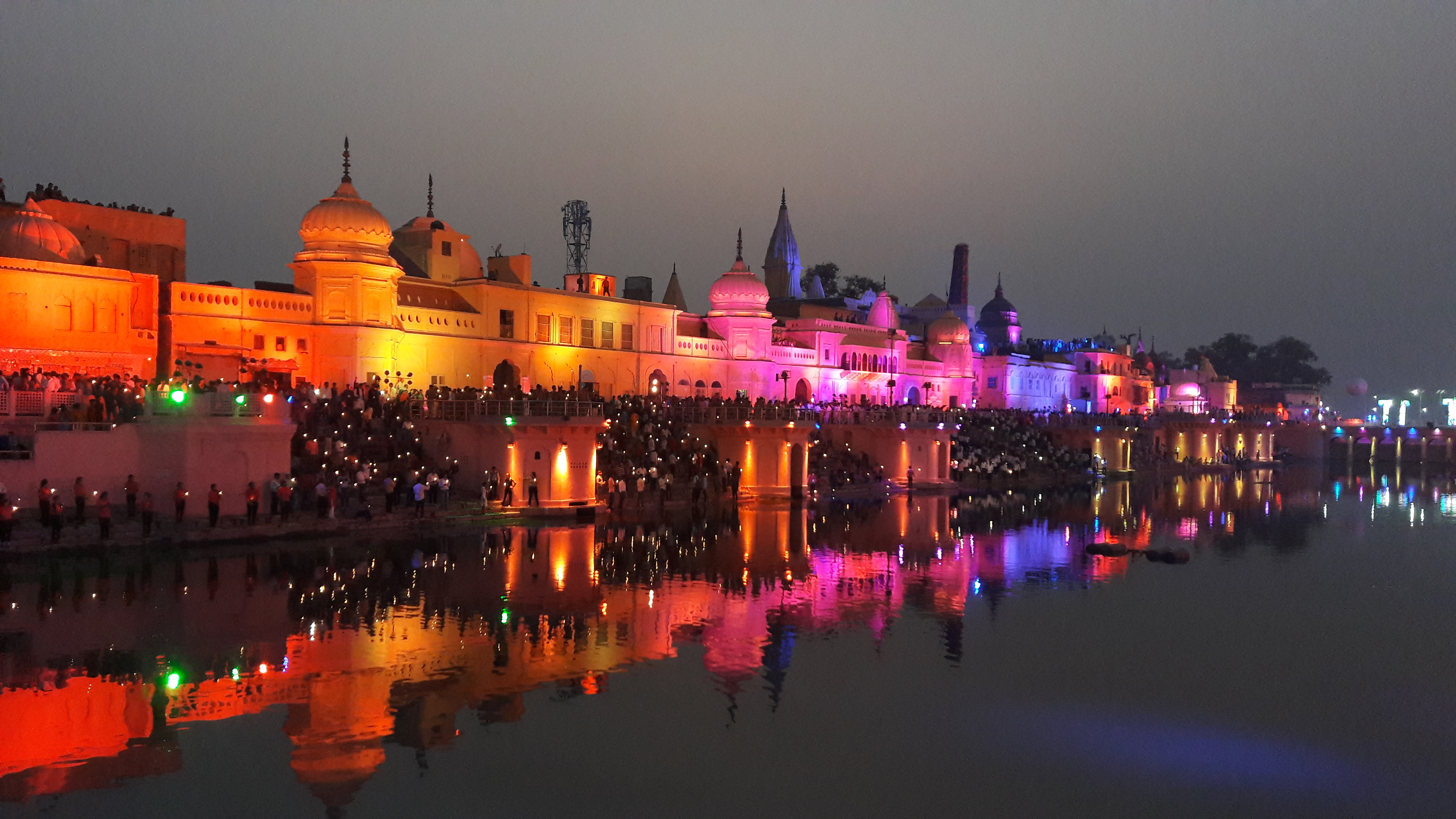
Ram ki Paidi

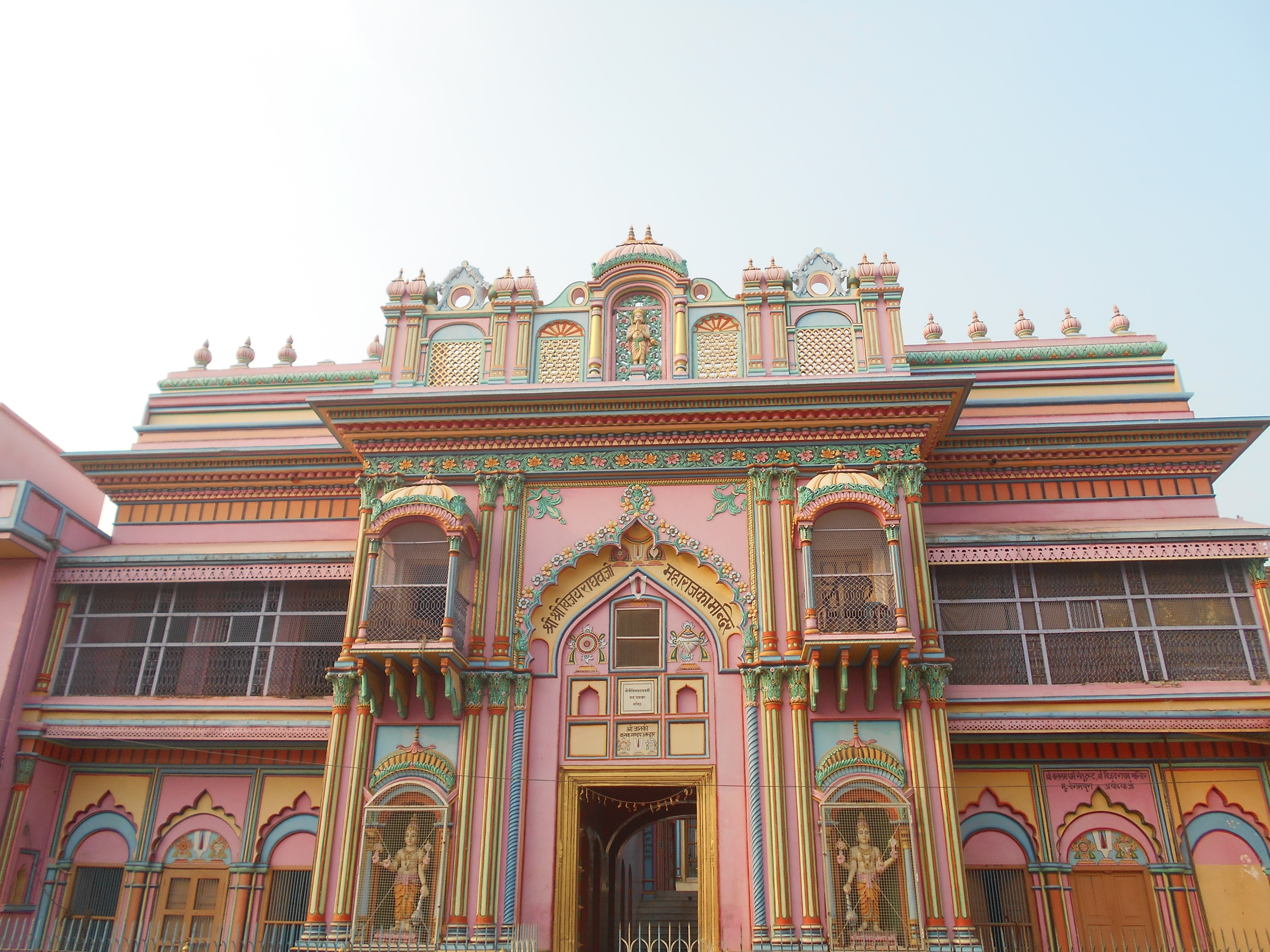
Sri Sri Vijayaraghavaji Temple

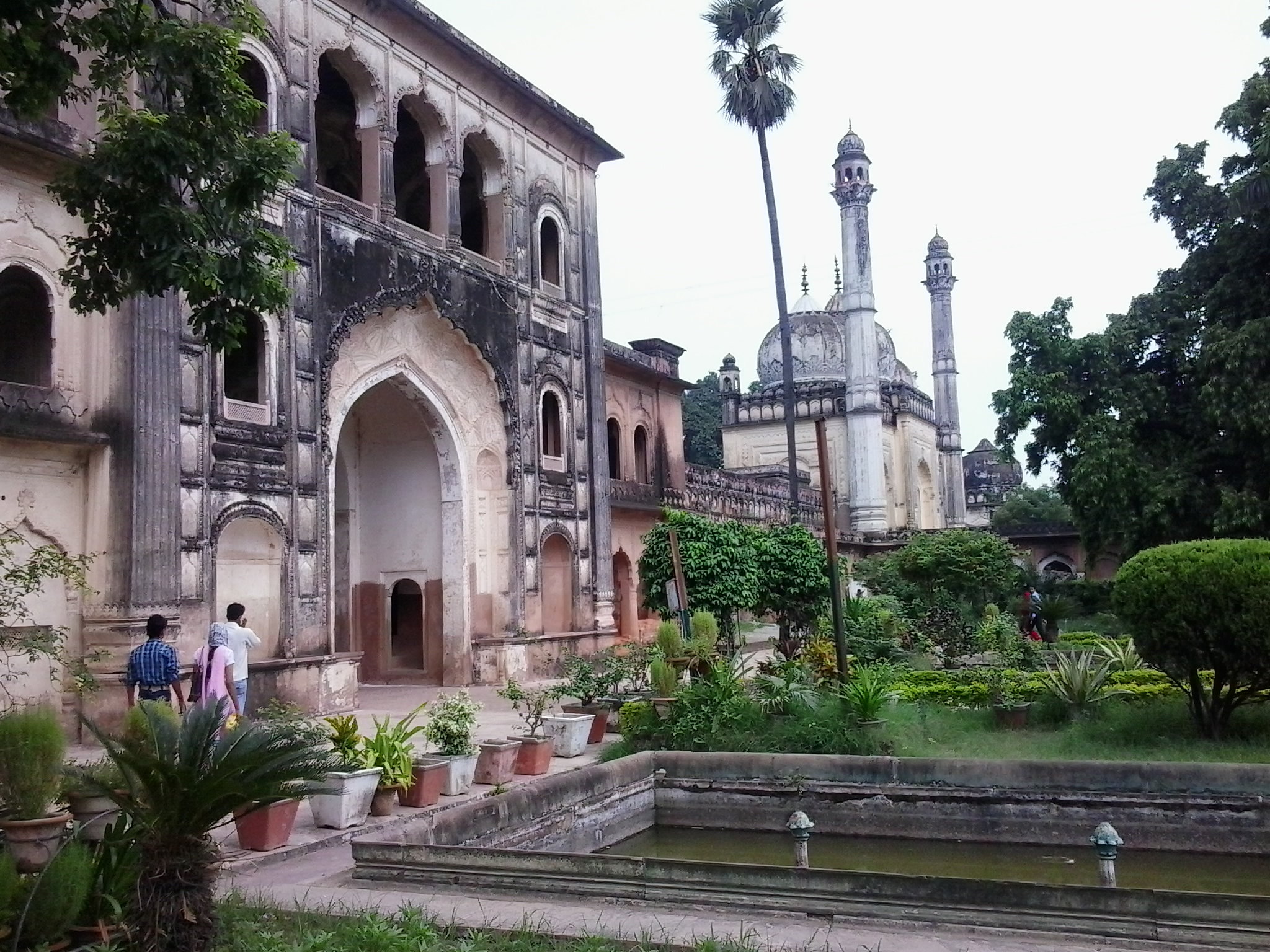
Gulab Bari

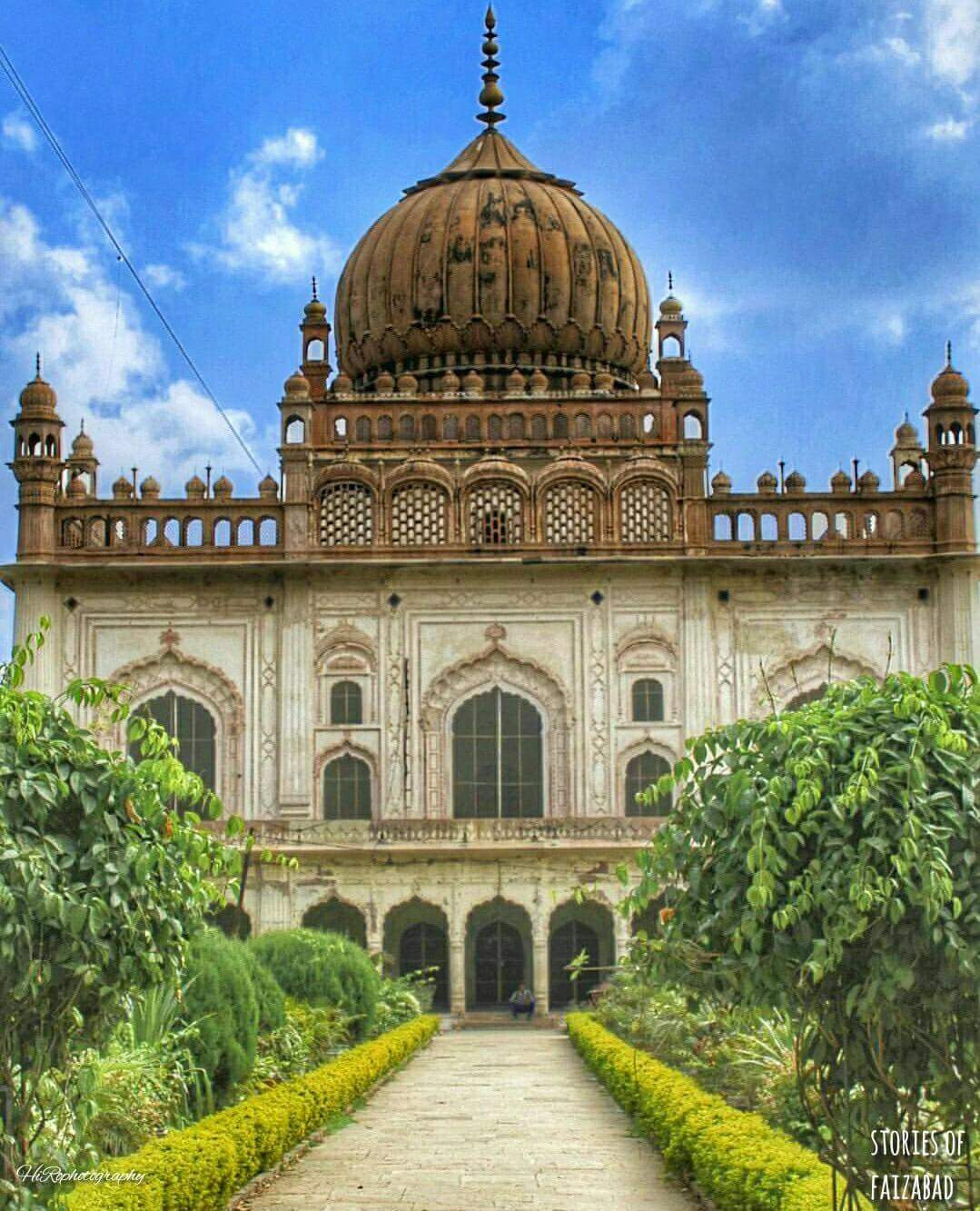
Shuja-ud-daula tomb

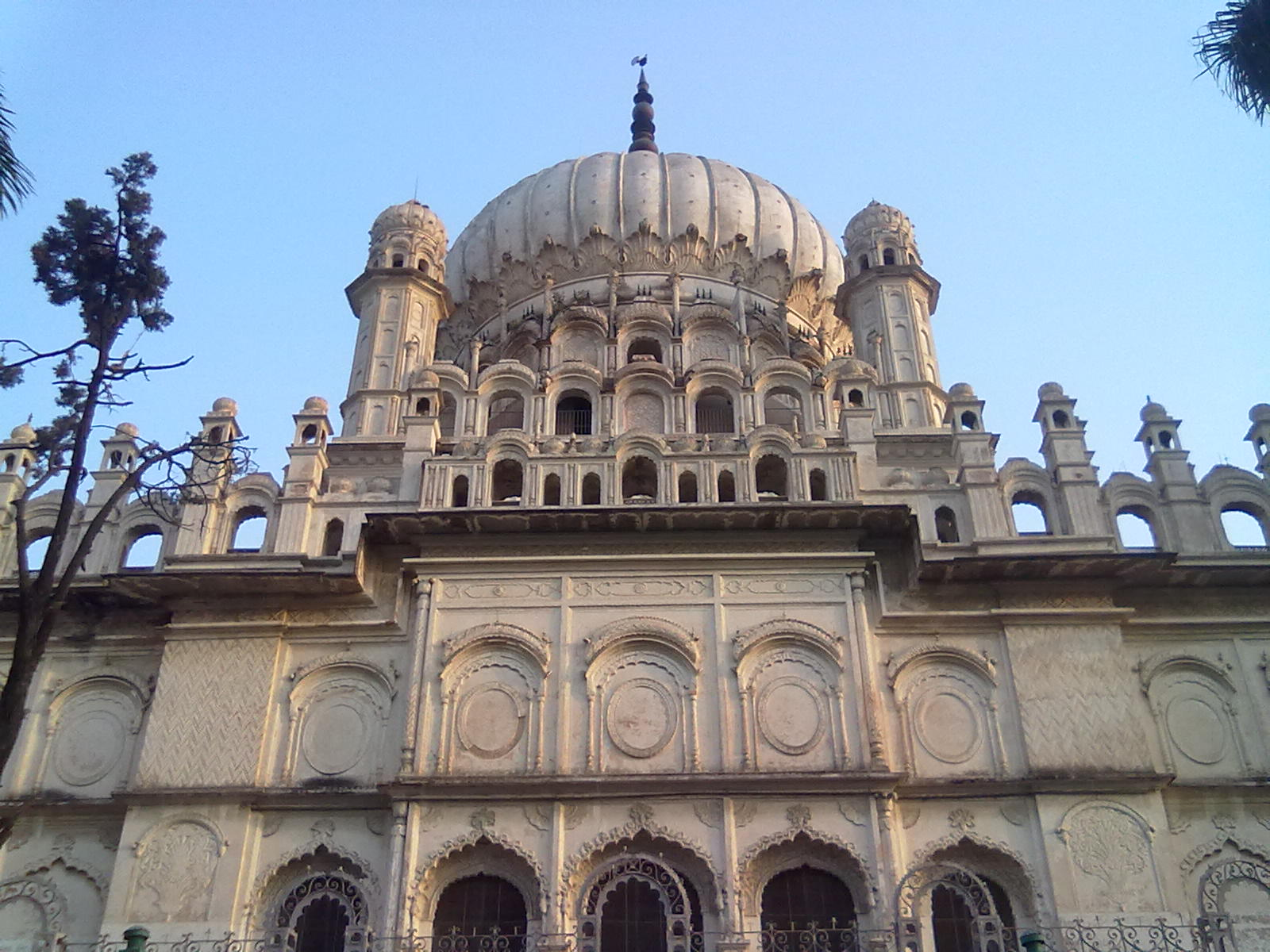
Tomb of Bahut Begam

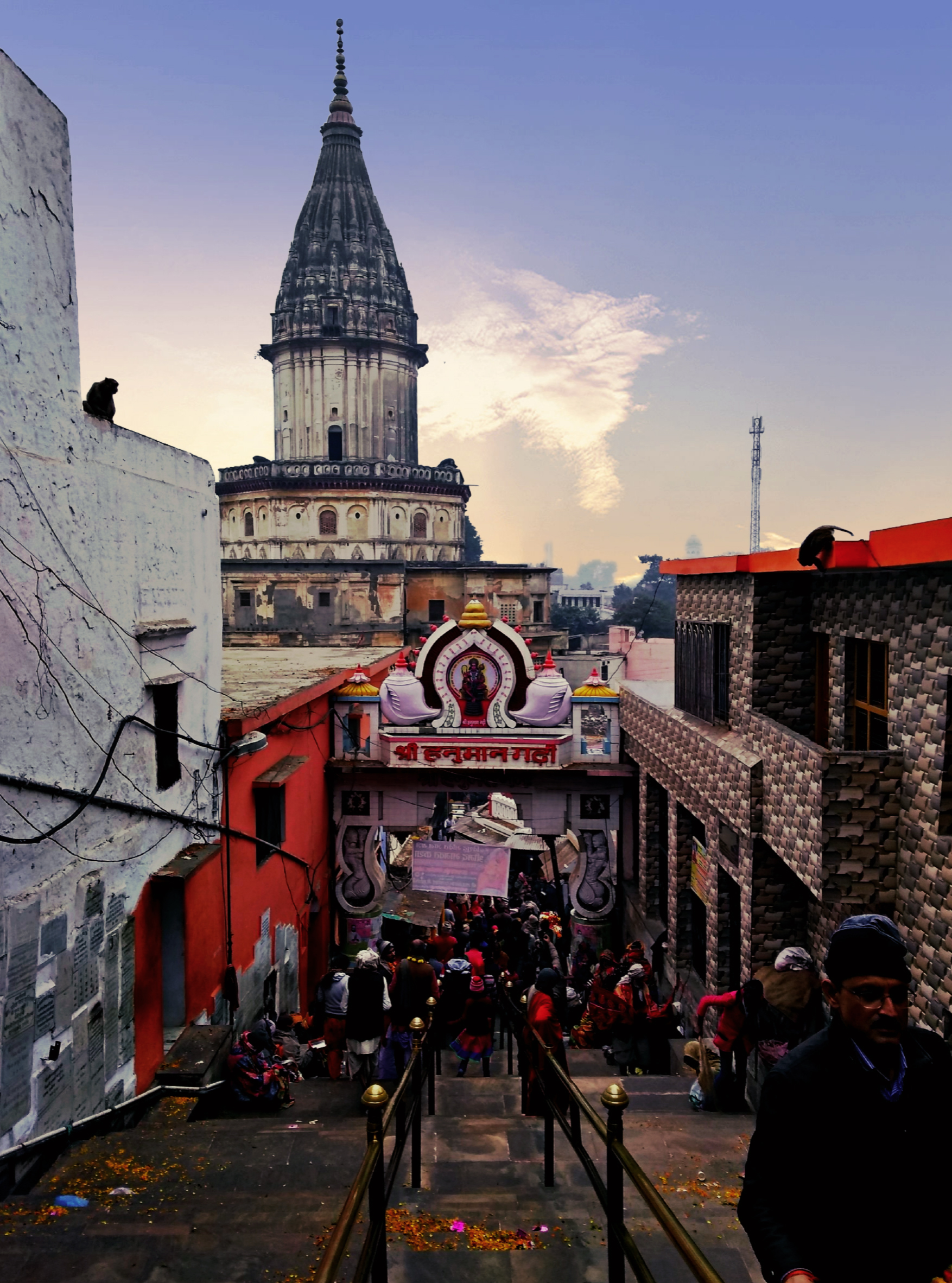
Hanuman Garhi Mandir

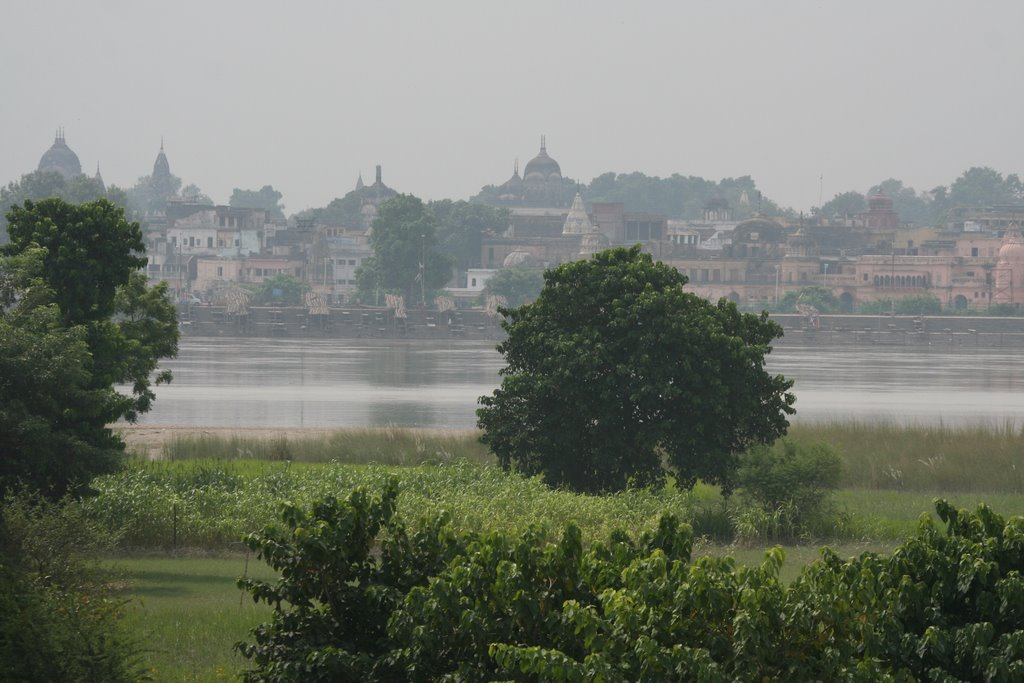
Ayodhya Ghats

=== Fatehpur Sikri ===
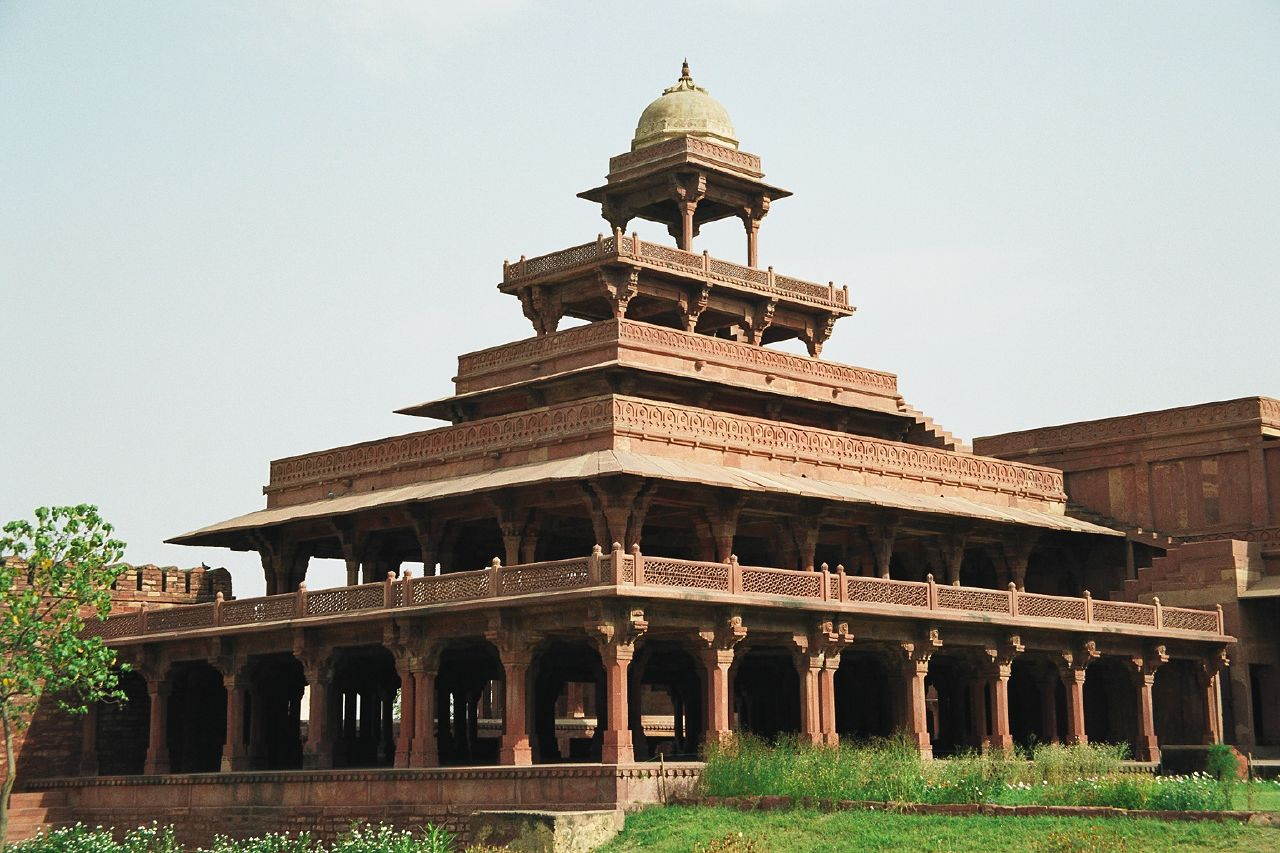
Panch Mahal, Fatehpur Sikri

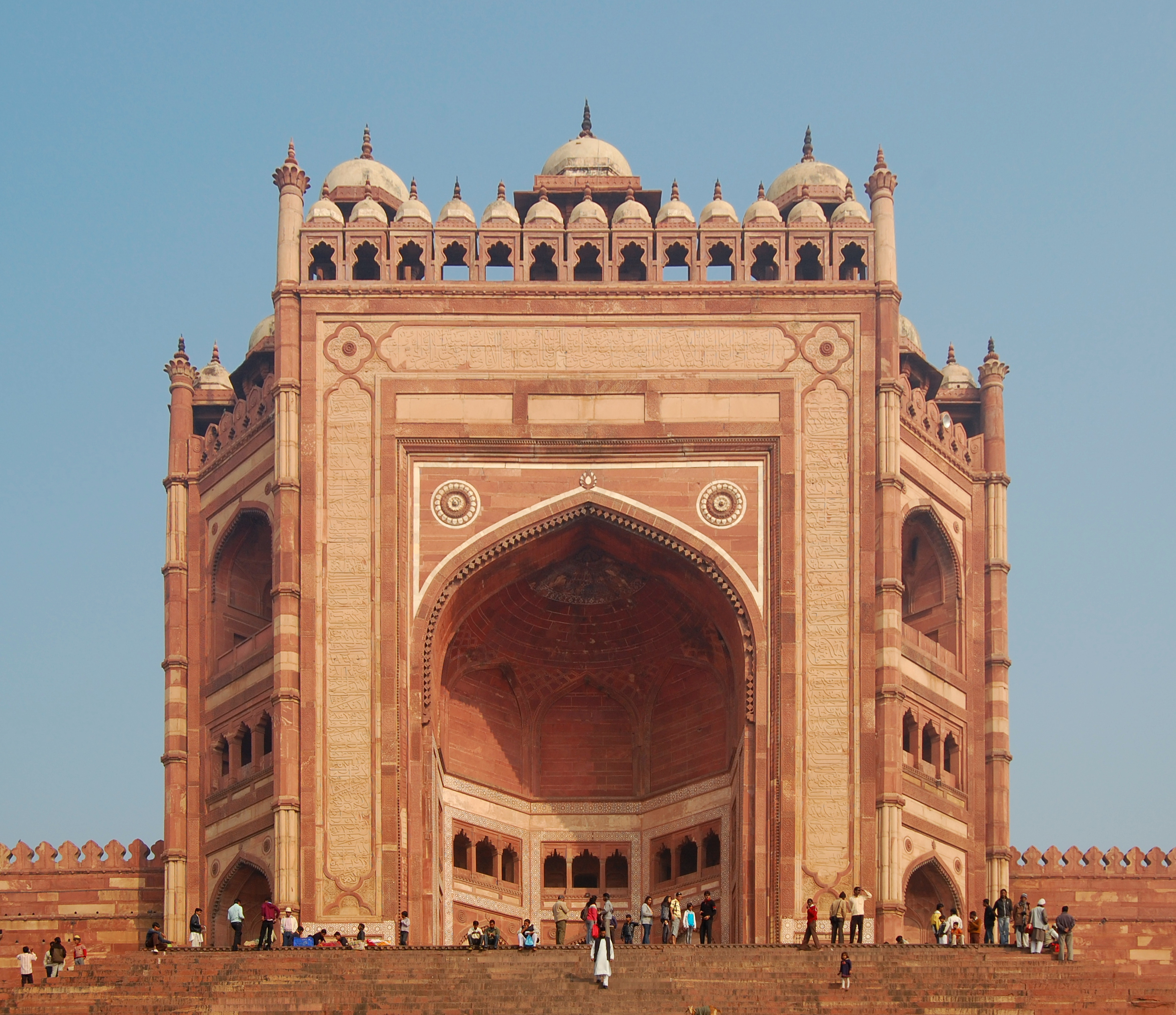
Buland Darwaza, the 54 mt. high entrance to Fatehpur Sikri complex

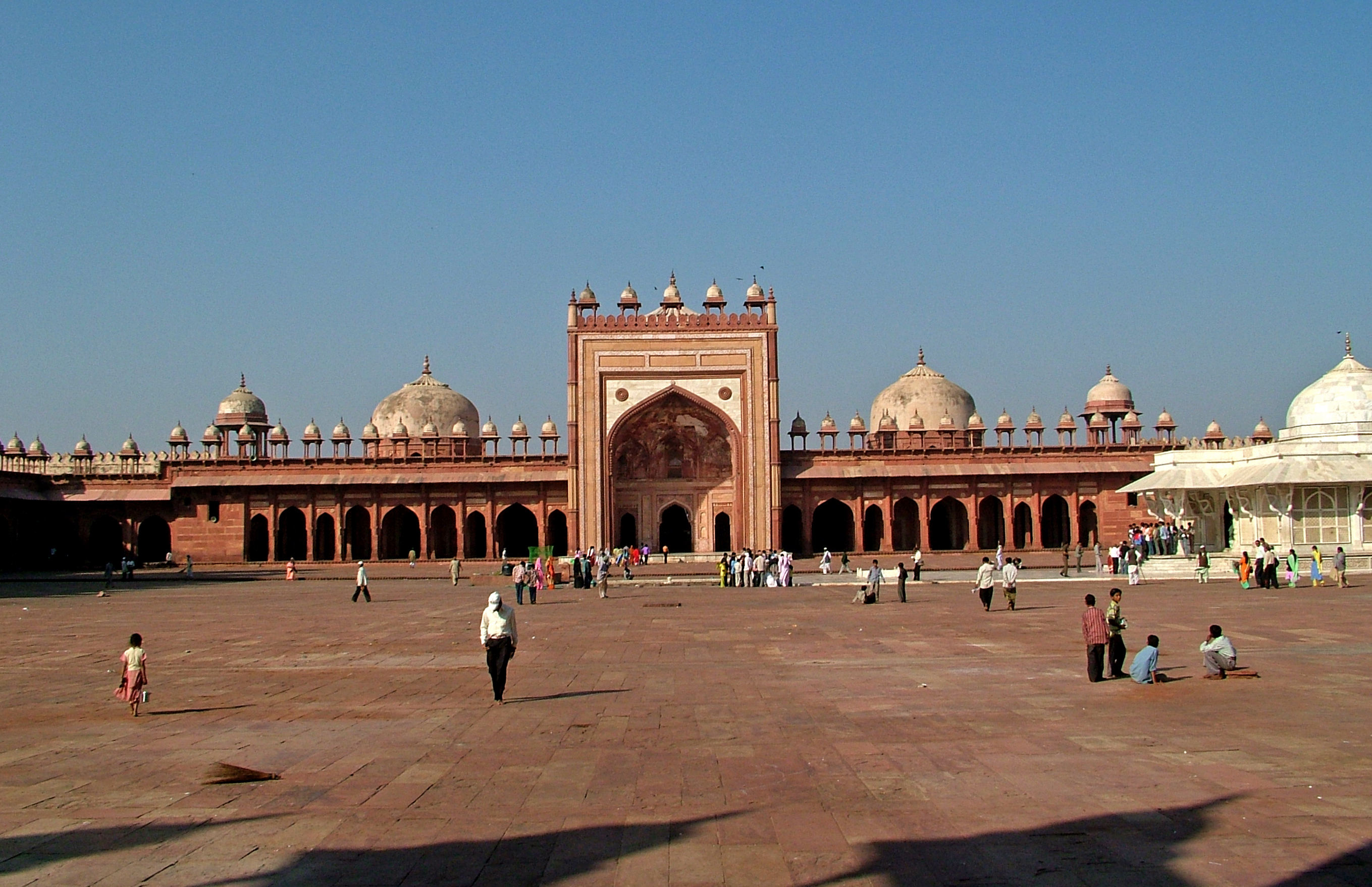
Jama Masjid

=== Kanpur ===
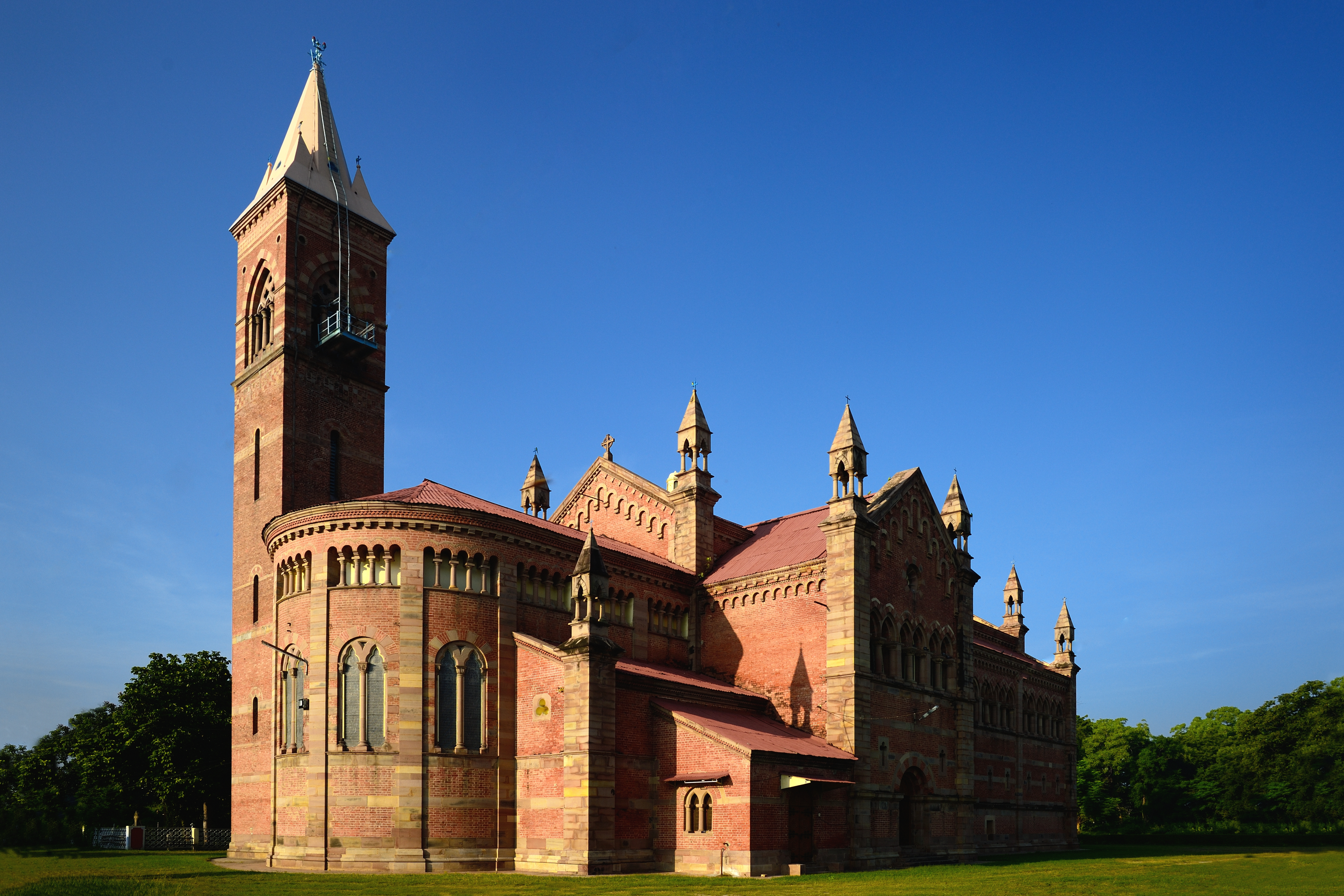
Kanpur Memorial Church

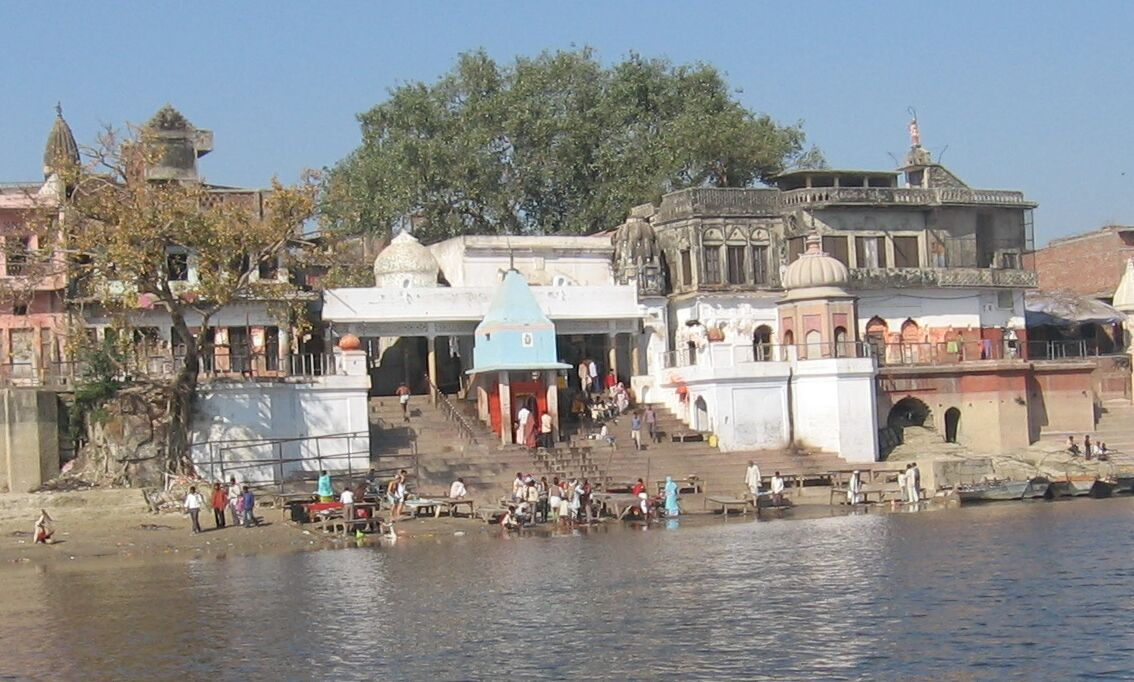
Brahmavart Ghat

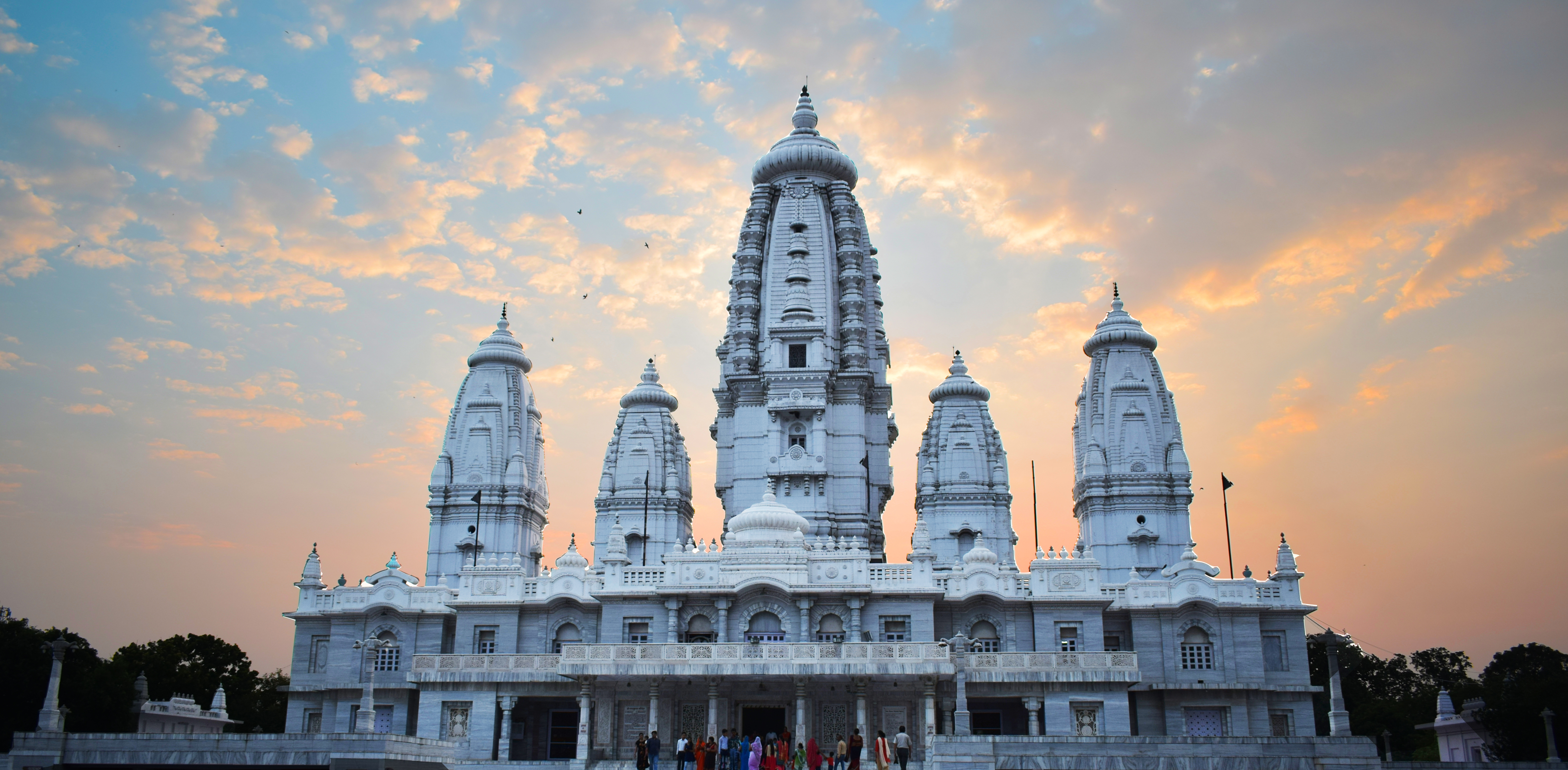
JK Temple

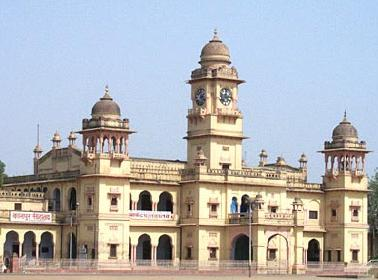
Kanpur Museum

=== Kushinagar ===
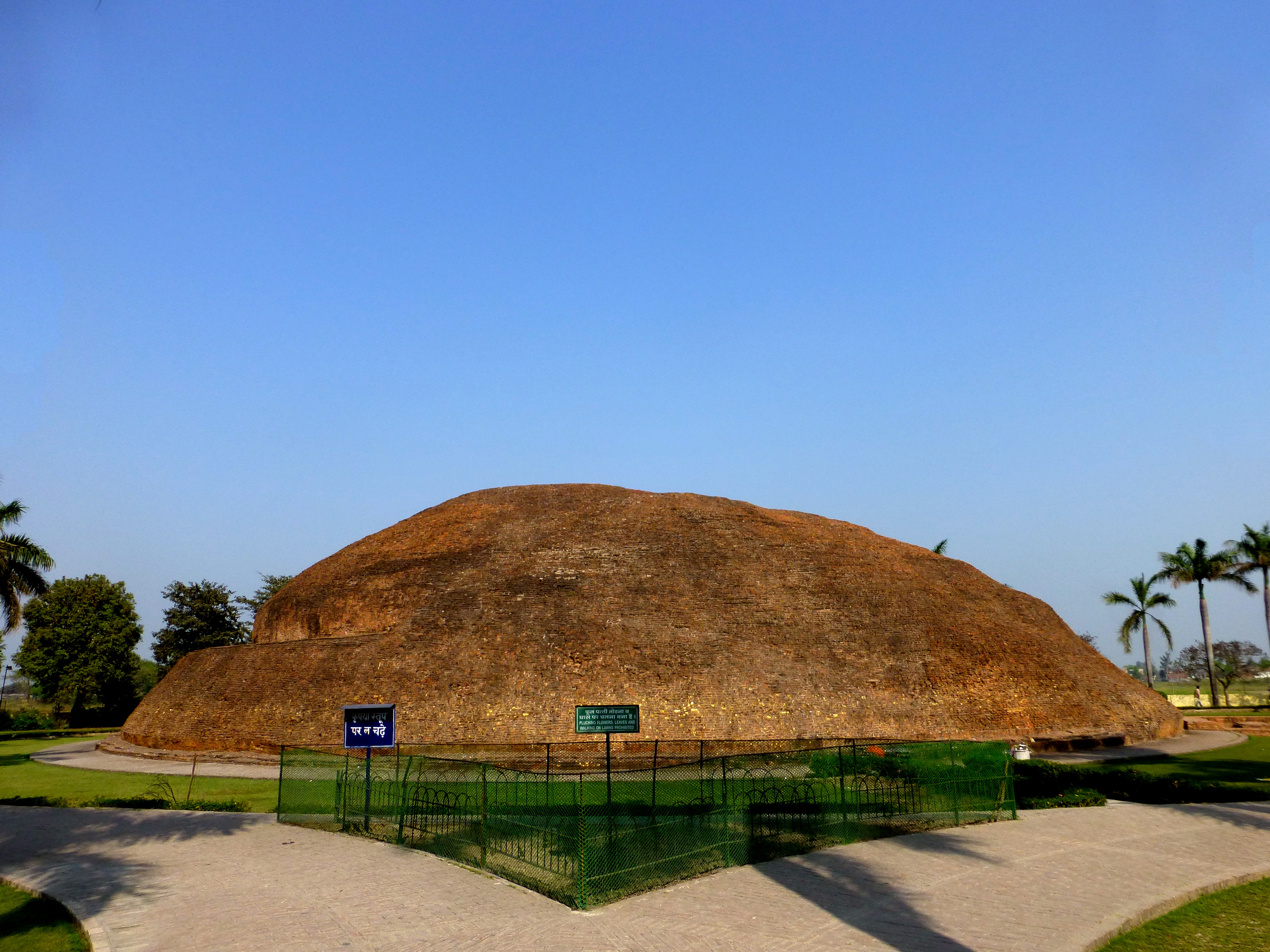
Ramabhar Stupa

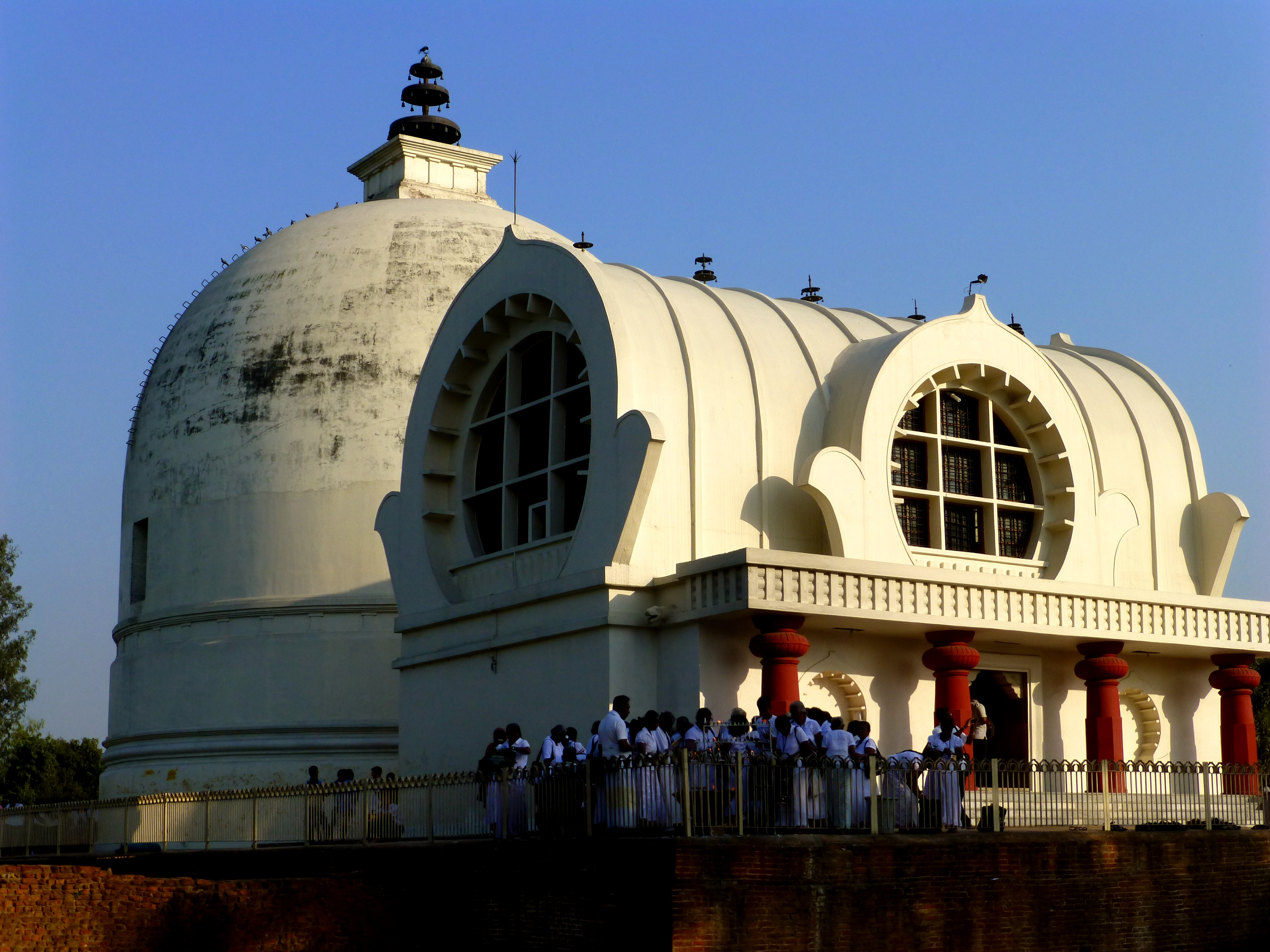
Parinirvana Stupa

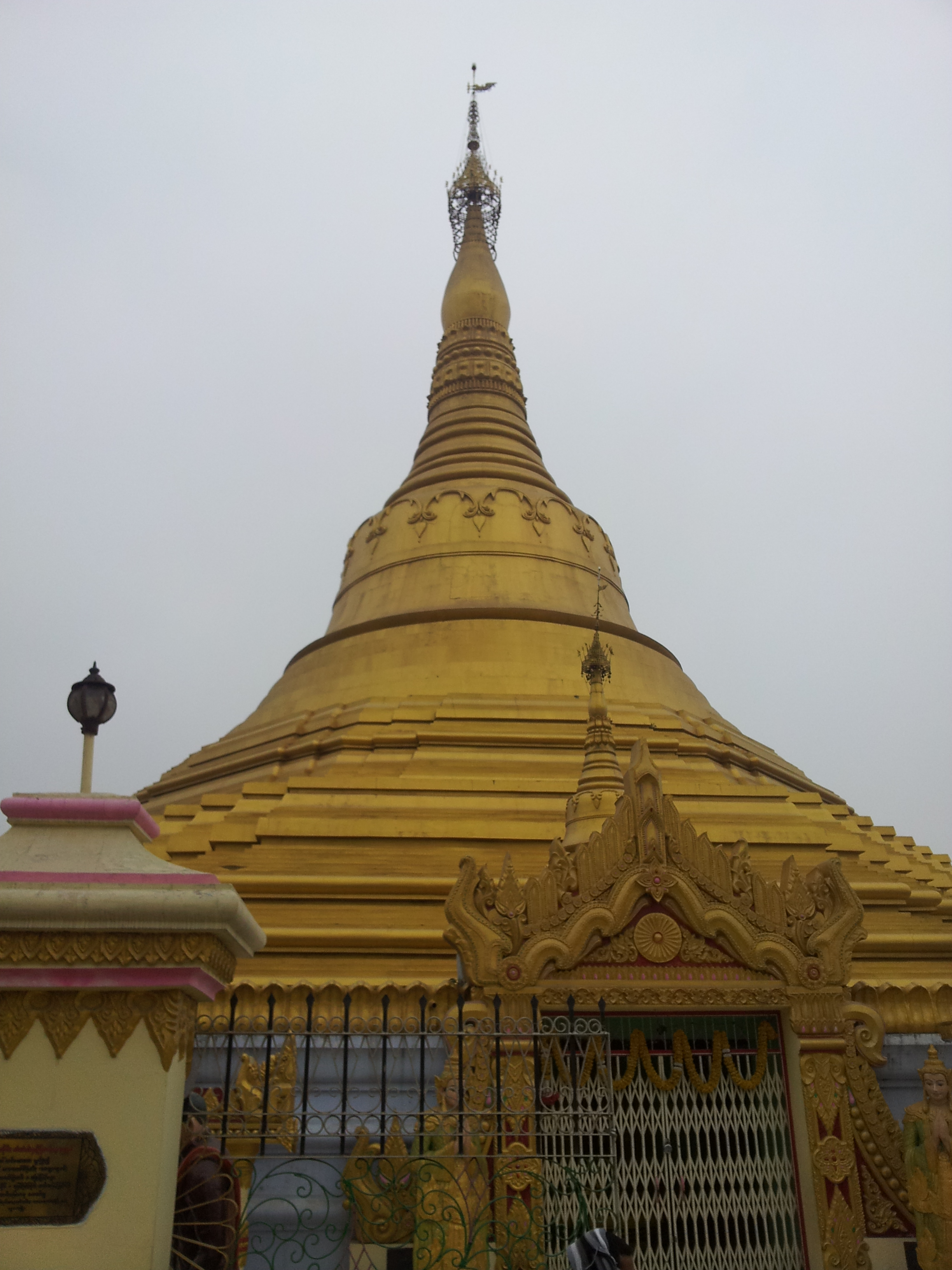
Mahasukhamdada Chin Thargyi Pagoda

=== Lucknow ===
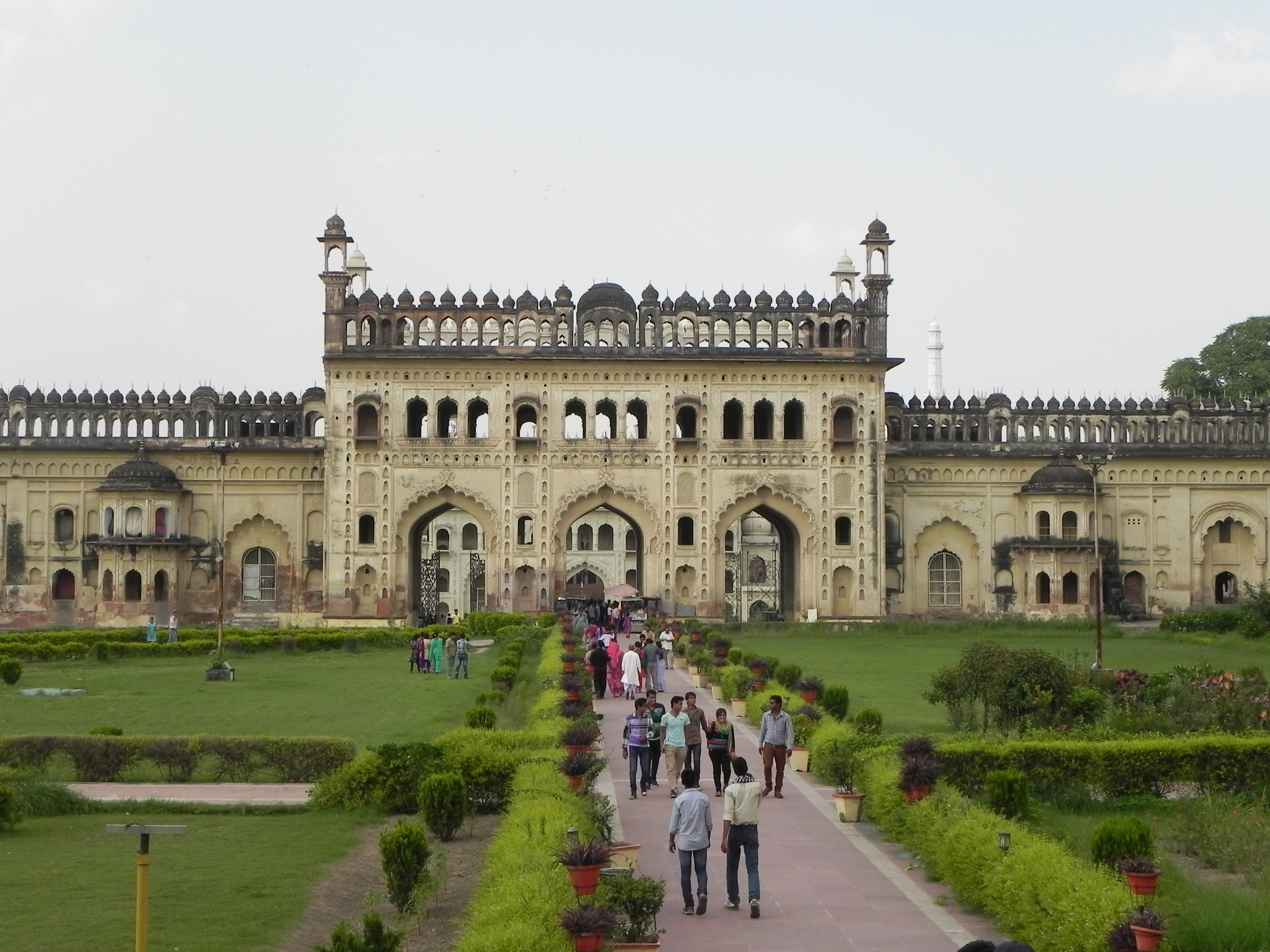
Gateway to Bara Imambara

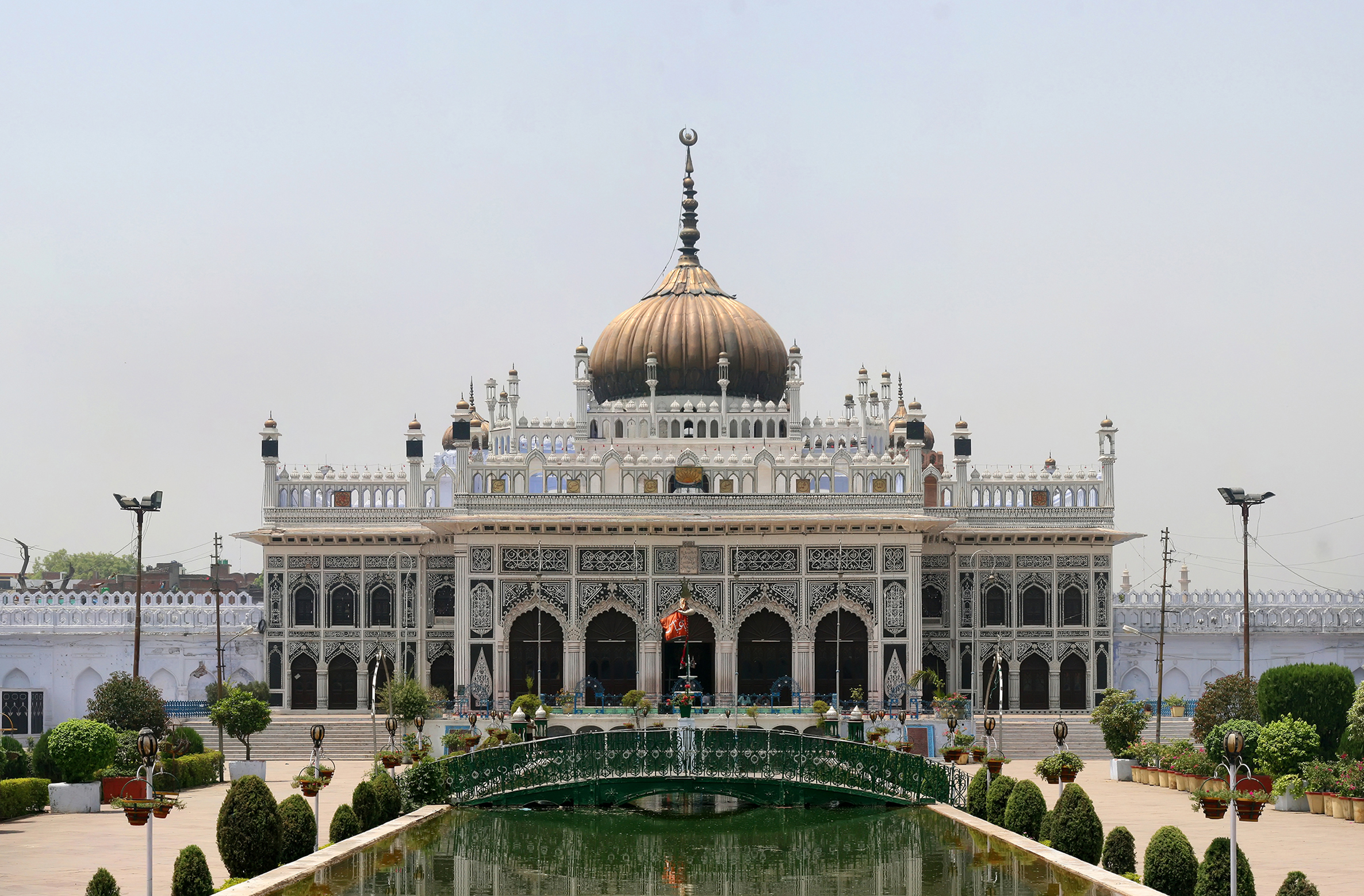
The Chhota Imambara

Husainabad Clock Tower

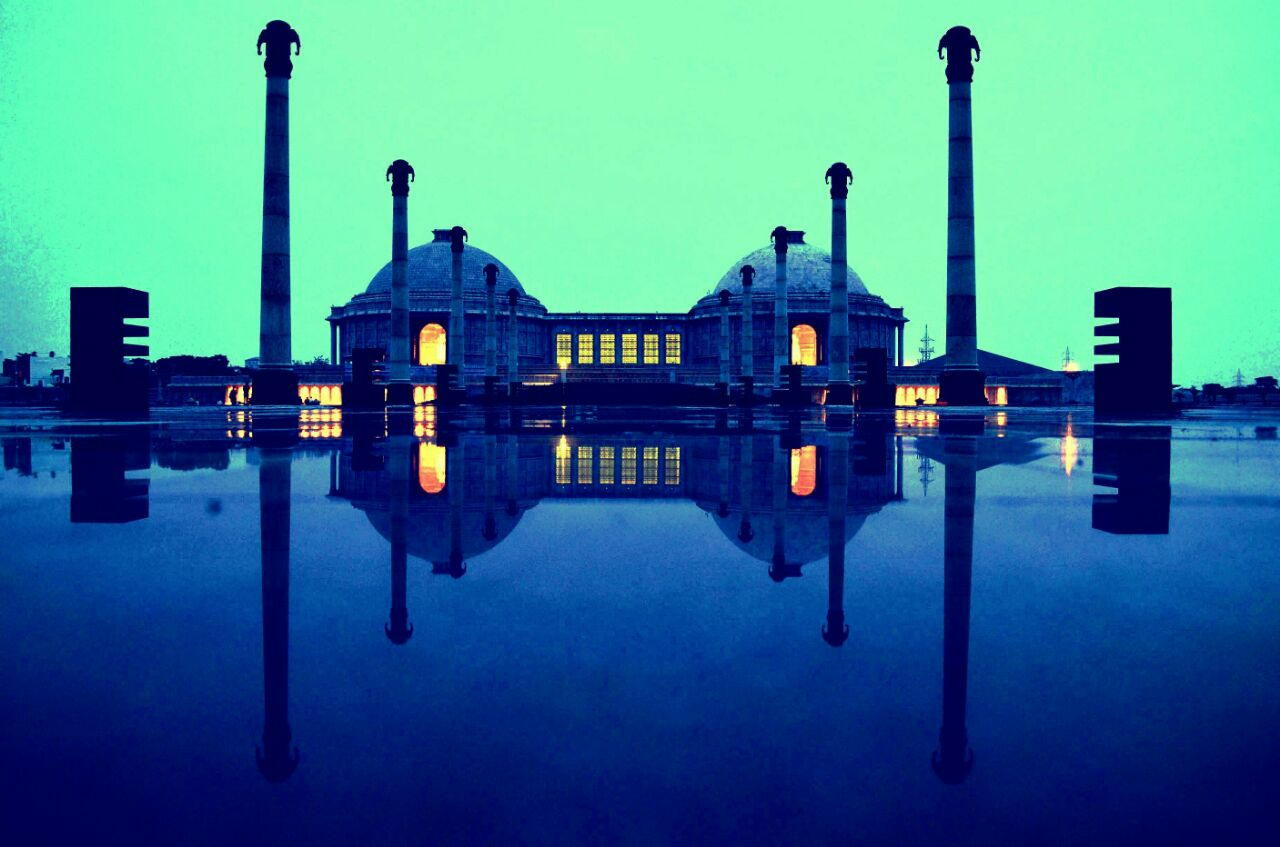
Ambedkar Memorial Park

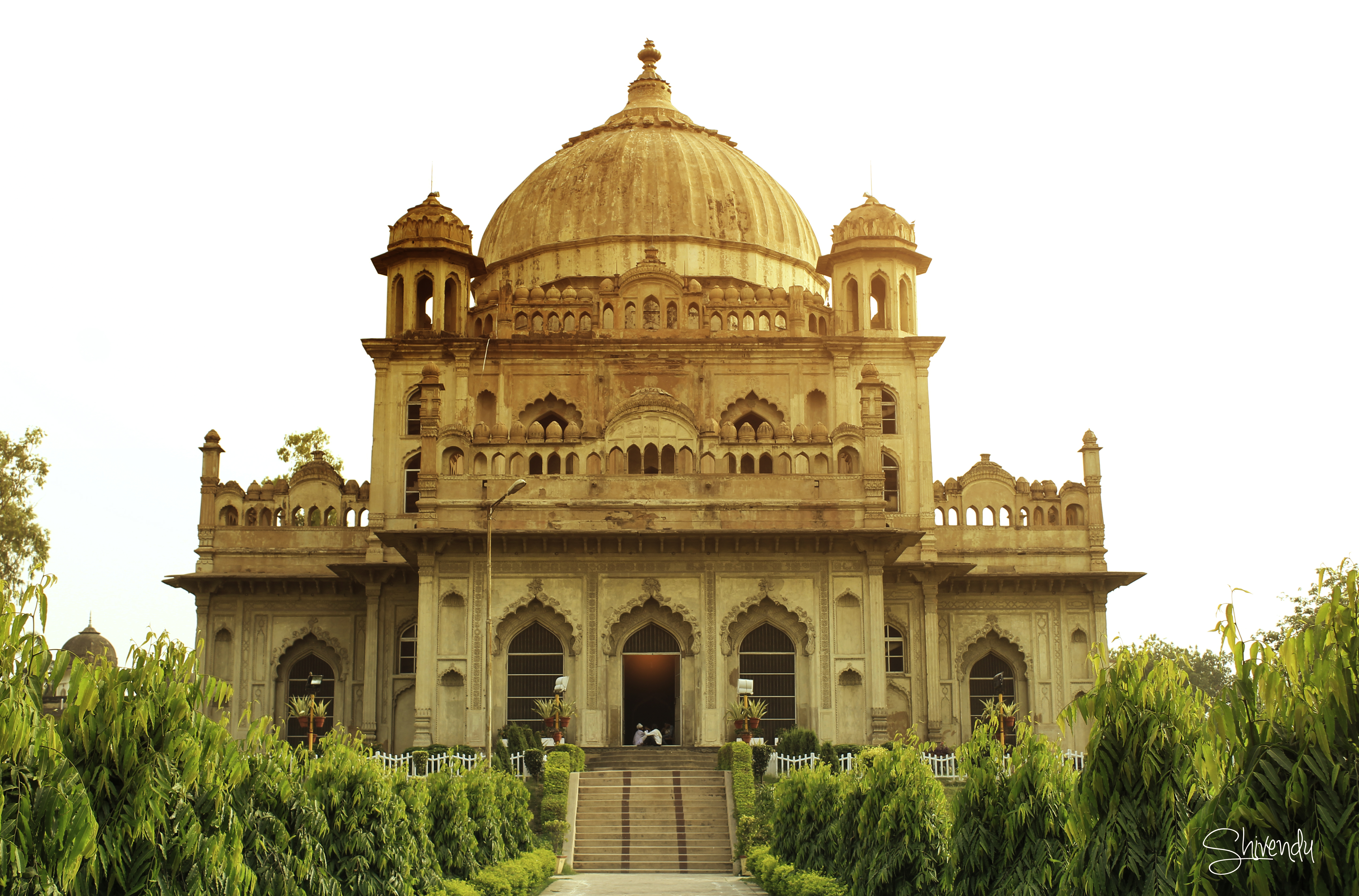
Park of Begum Hazrat Mahal

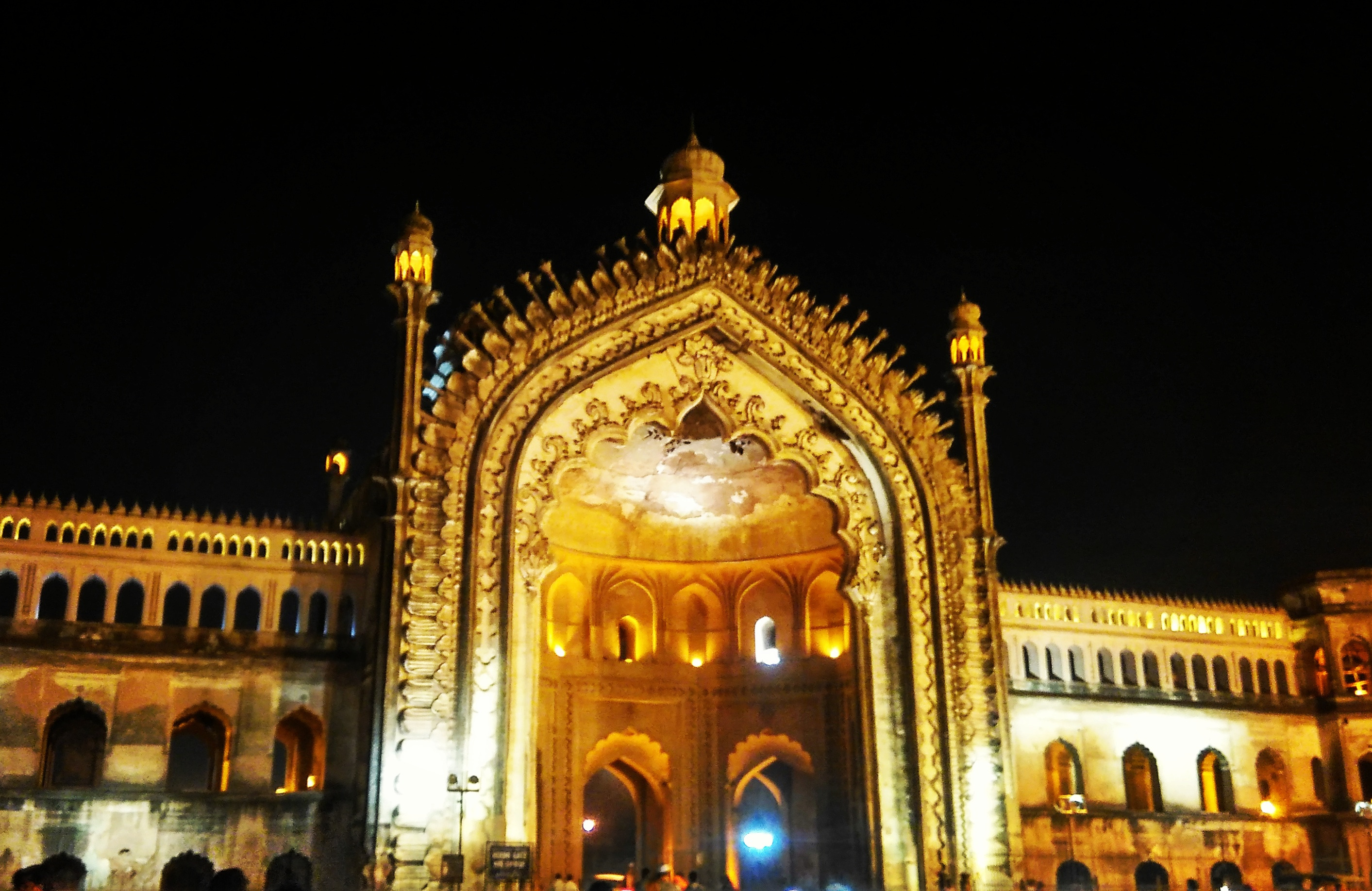
Rumi Darwaza

=== Mathura and Vrindavan ===
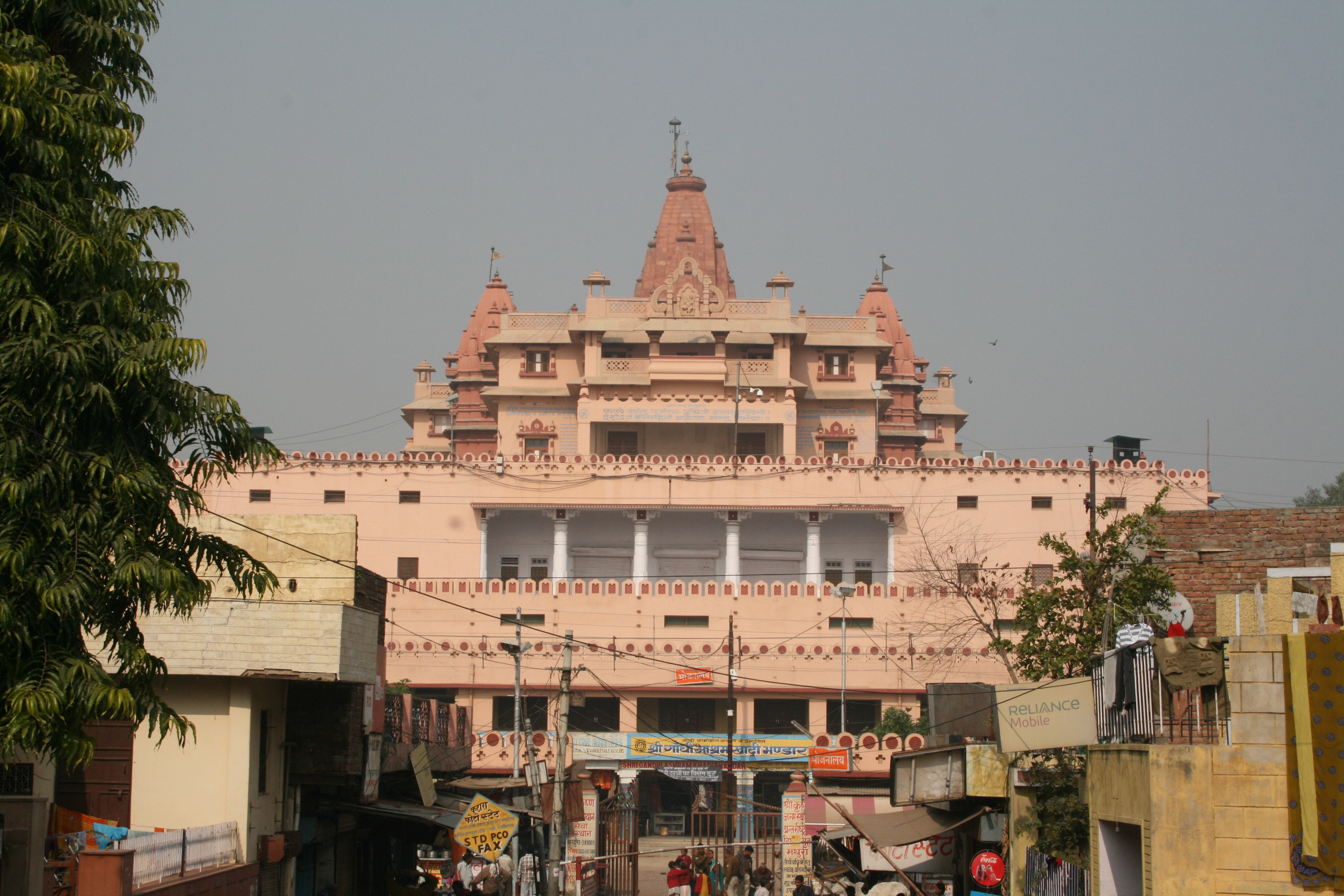
Krishna temple in Mathura.

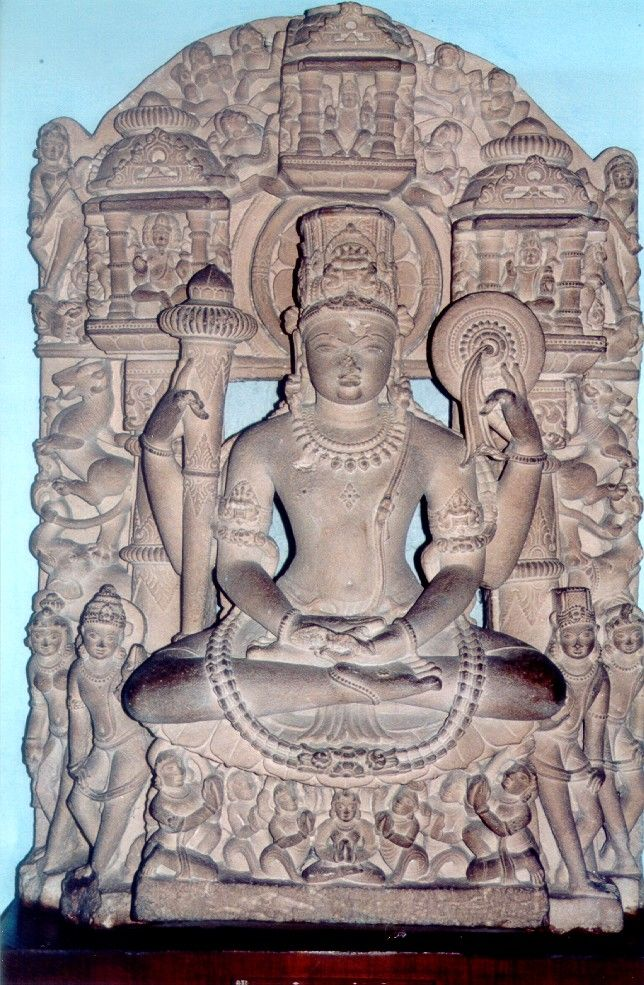
Statue of Lord Vishnu in Mathura

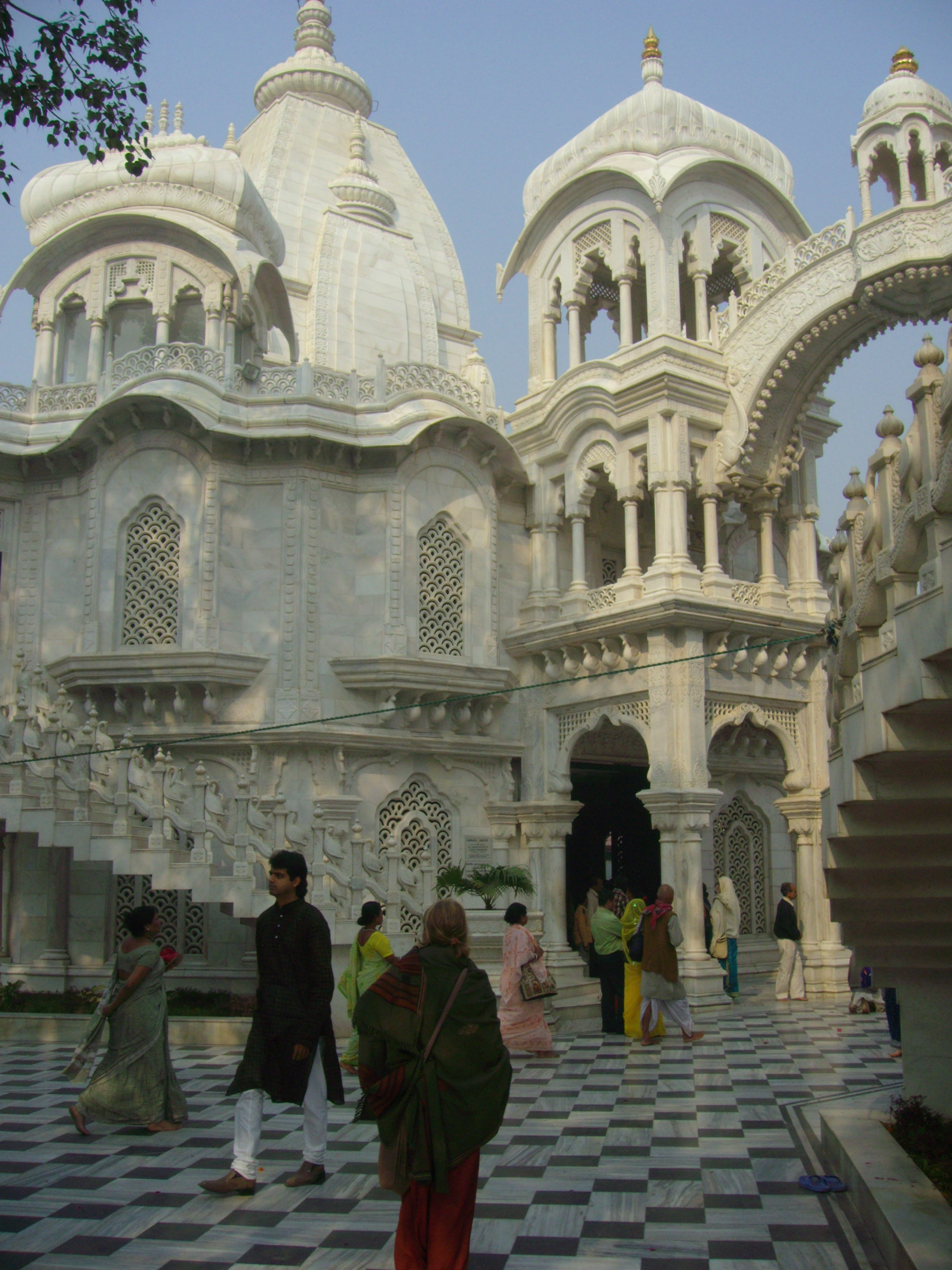
Krishna Balaram Mandir, ISKCON temple, Vrindavan

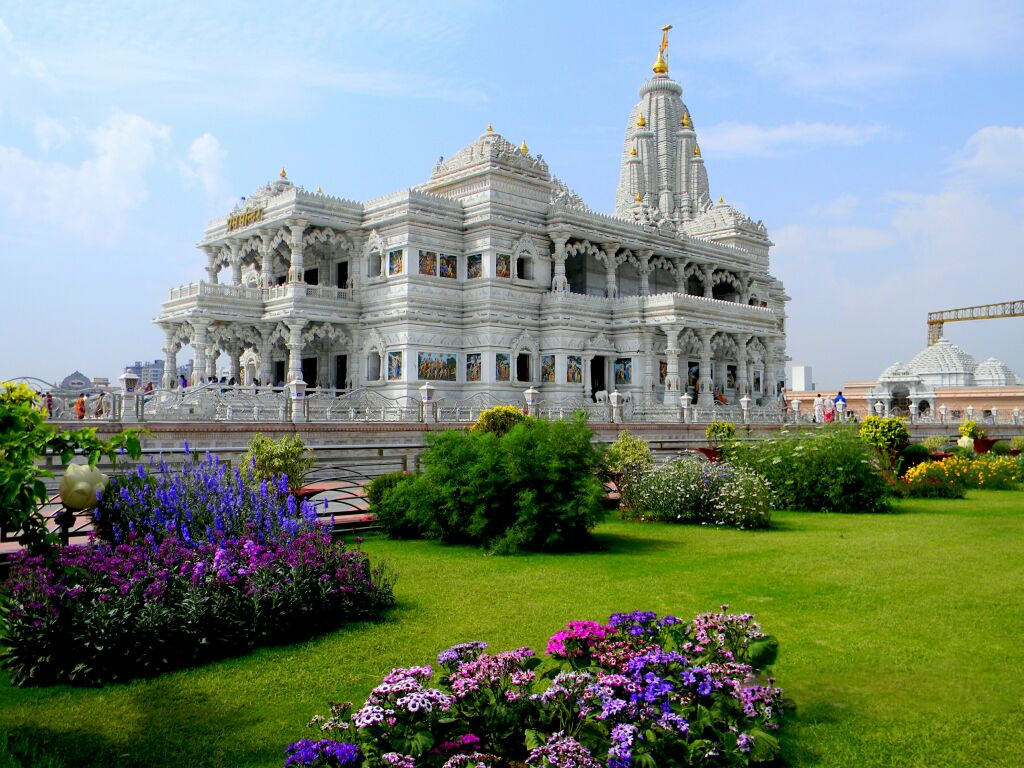
Prem Mandir Vrindavan

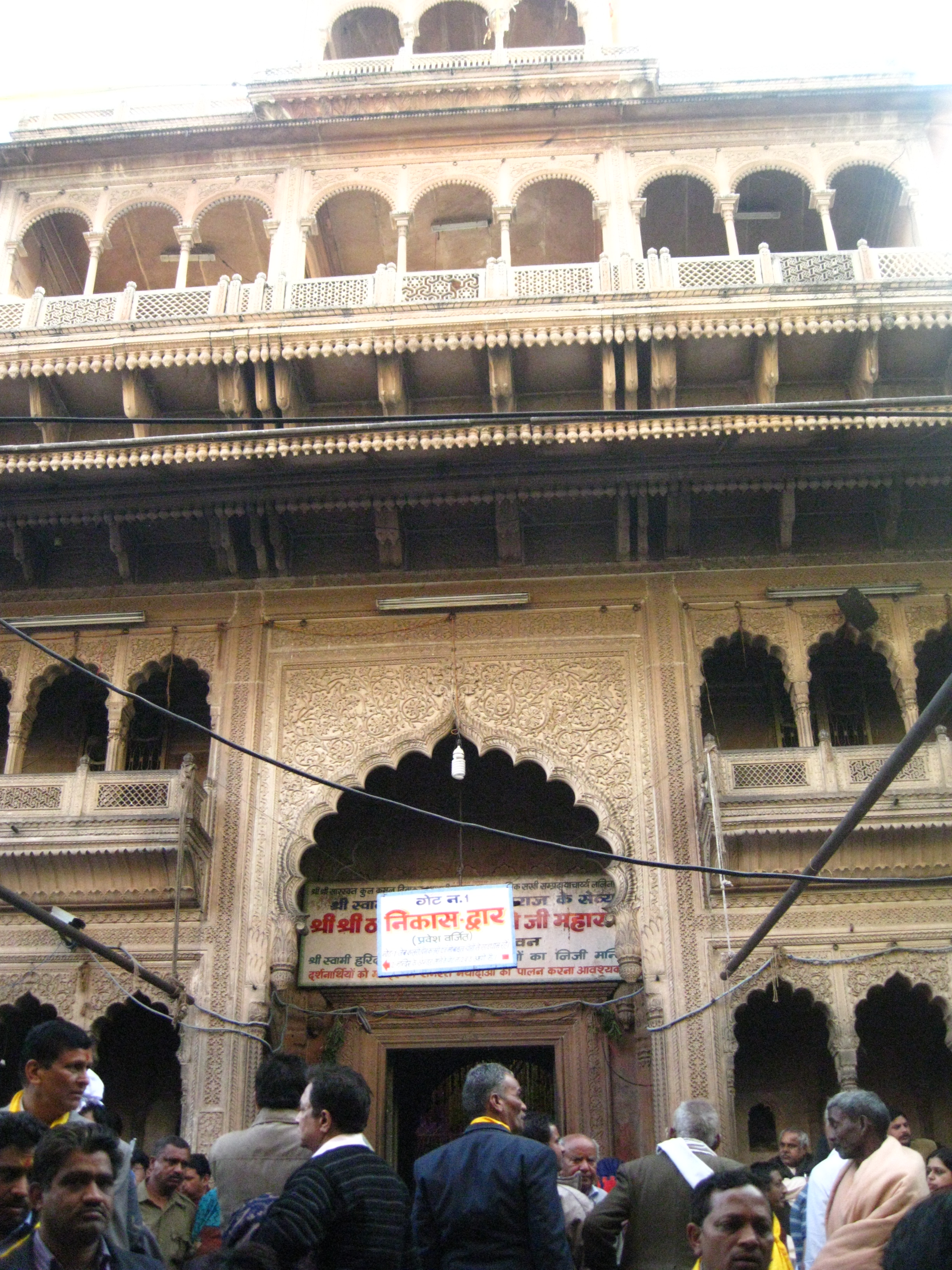
Main gate of Banke Bihari Temple, Vrindavan

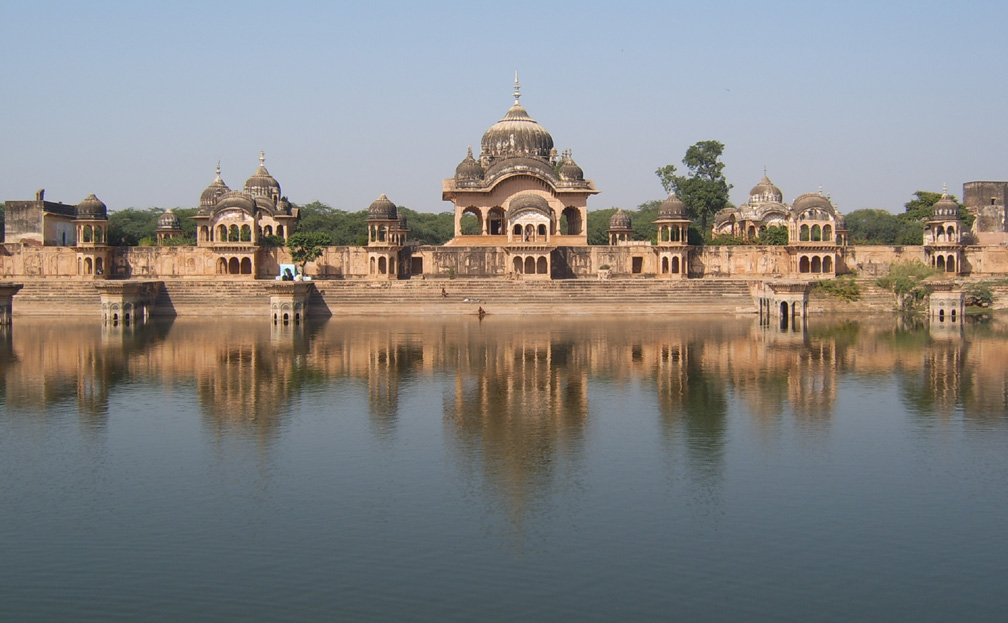
Kusuma Sarovar bathing ghat, in the Govardhan area, Vrindavan.

=== Varanasi and Sarnath ===
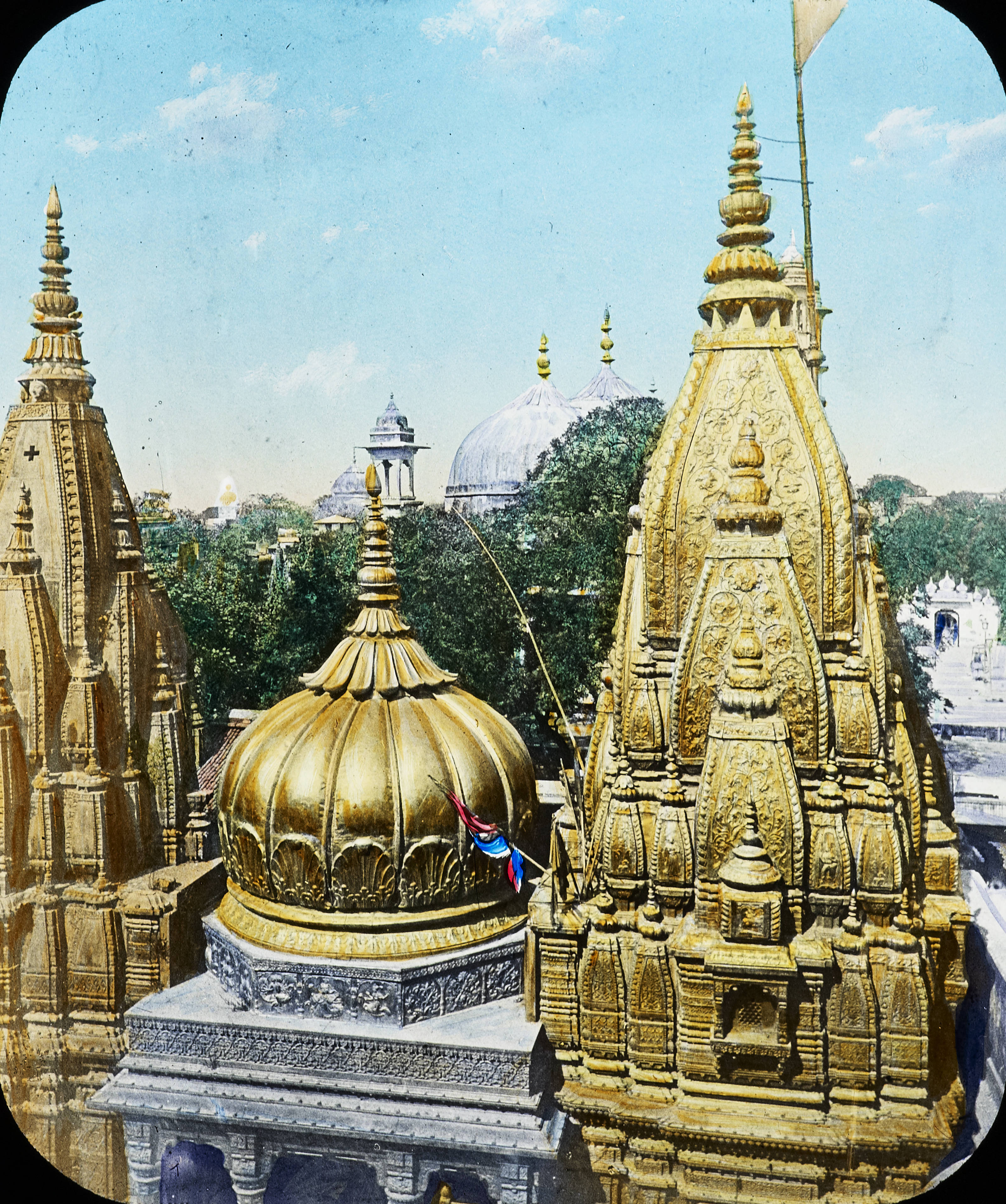
Kashi Vishwanath Temple

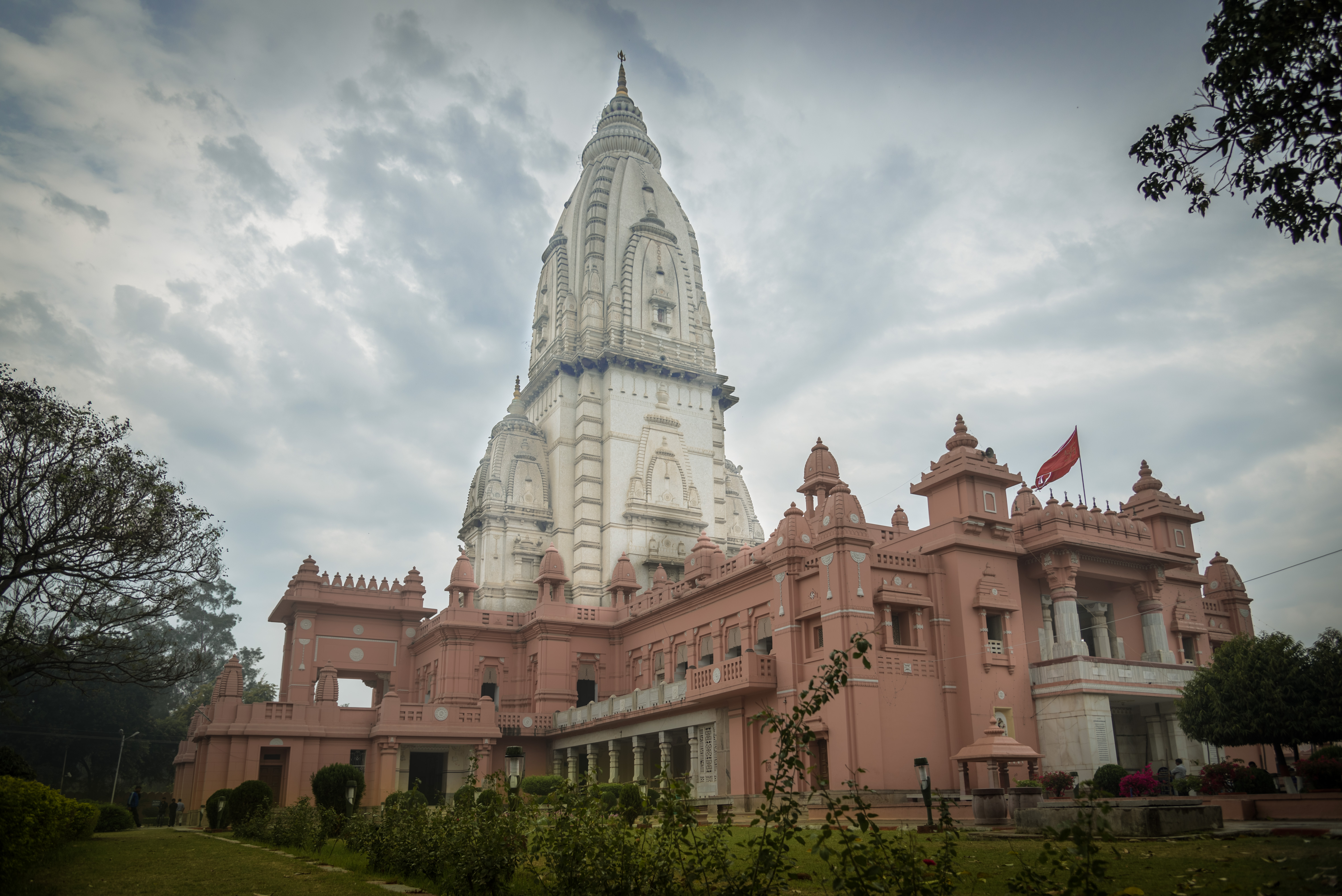
Shri Vishwanath Temple

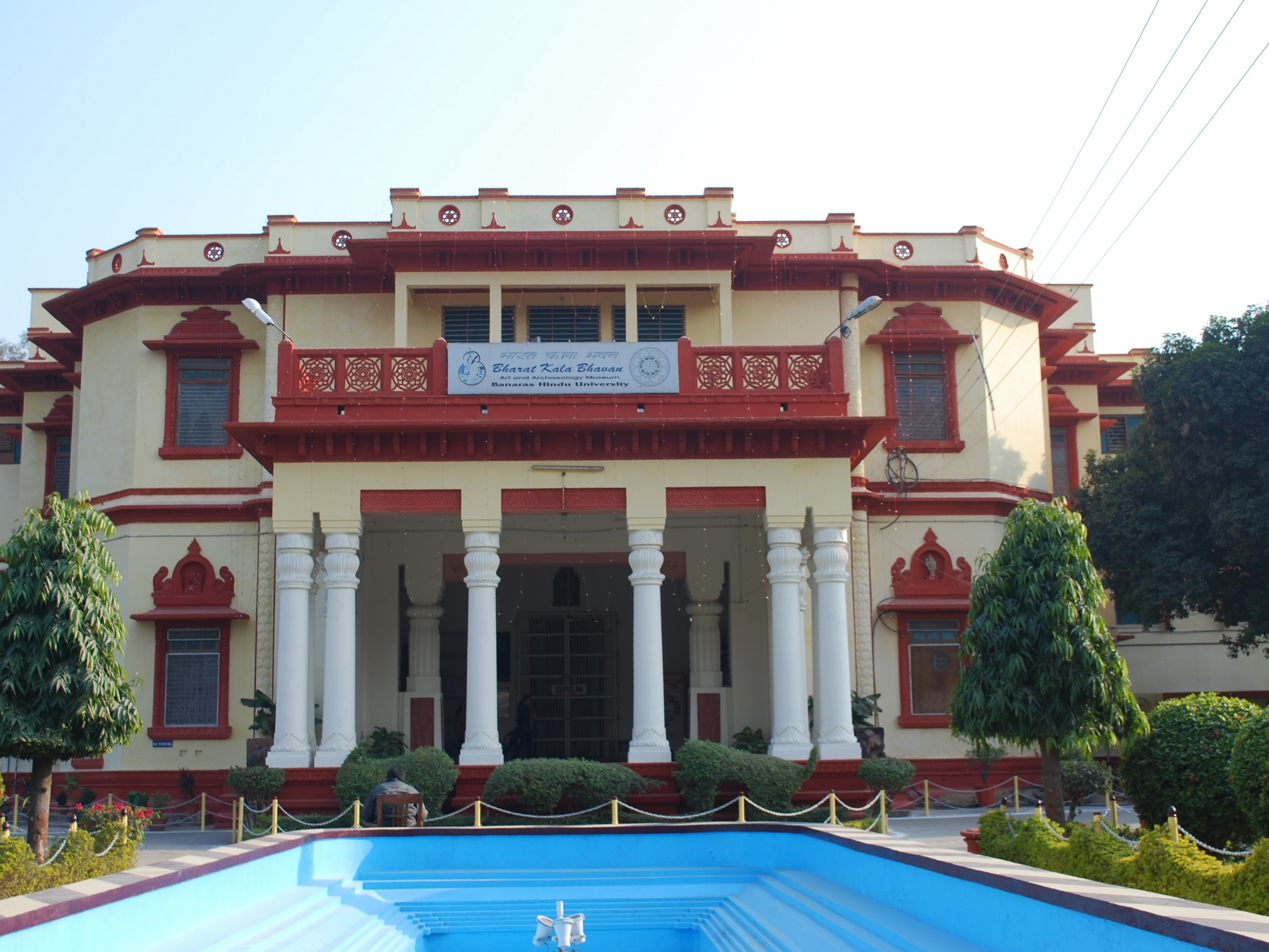
Bharat Kala Bhavan

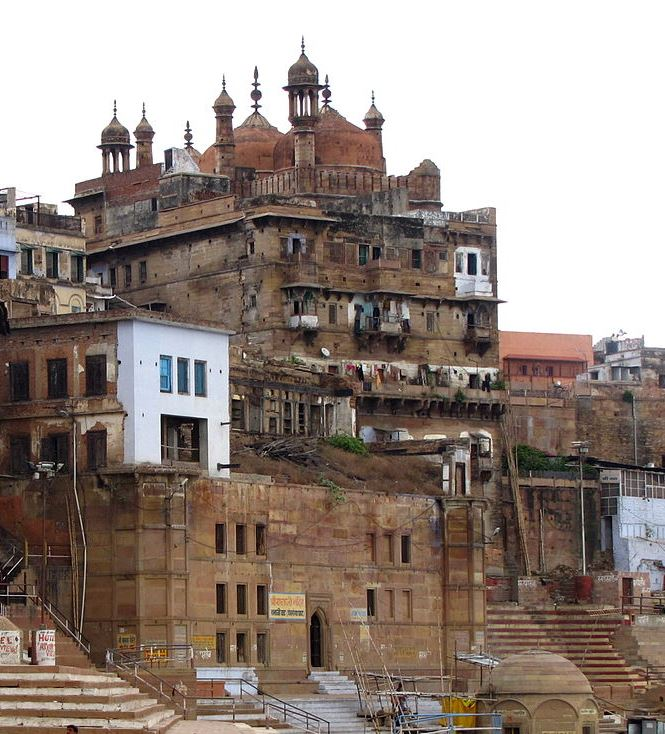
Alamgir Mosque

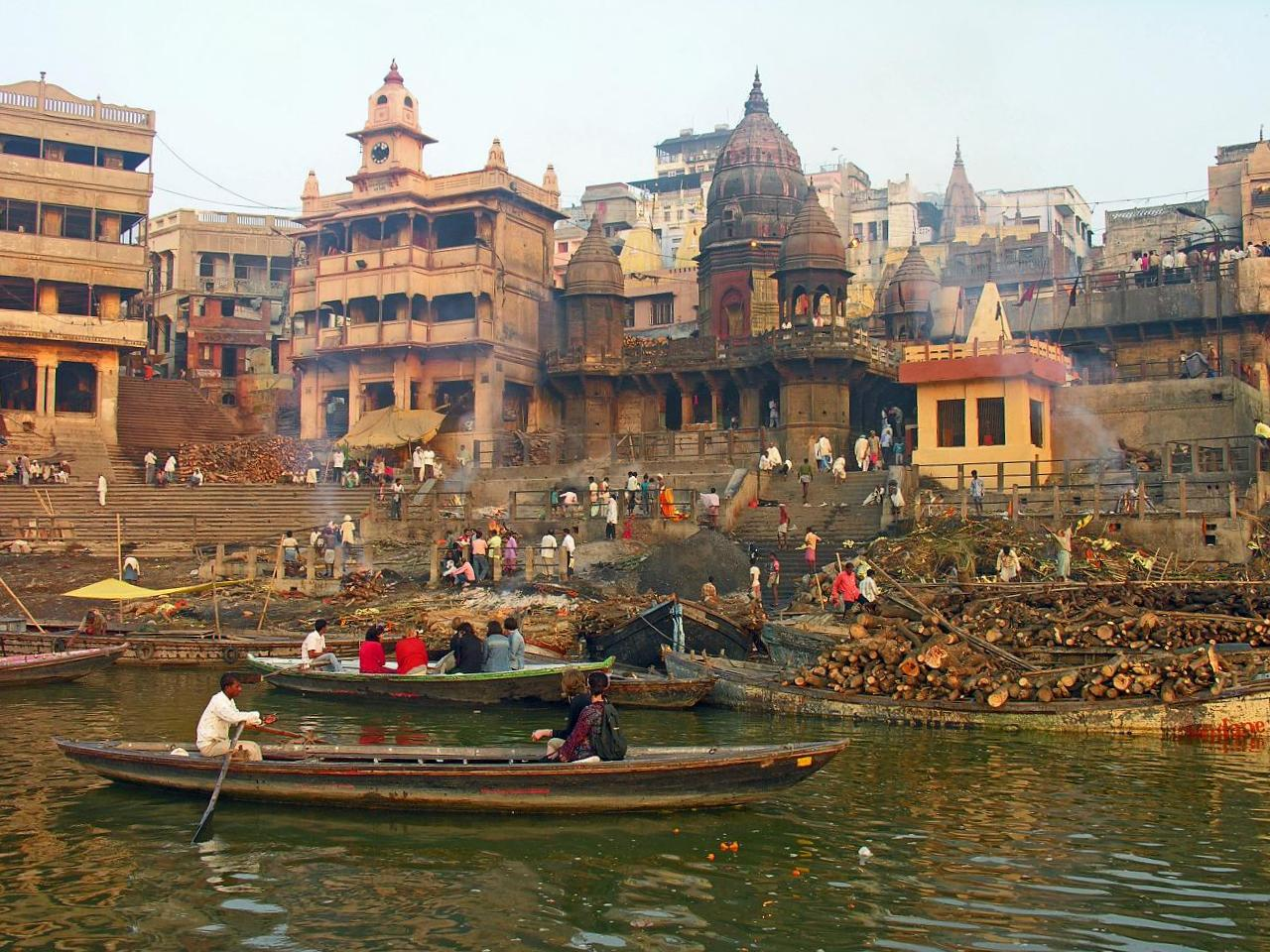
Manikarnika Ghat

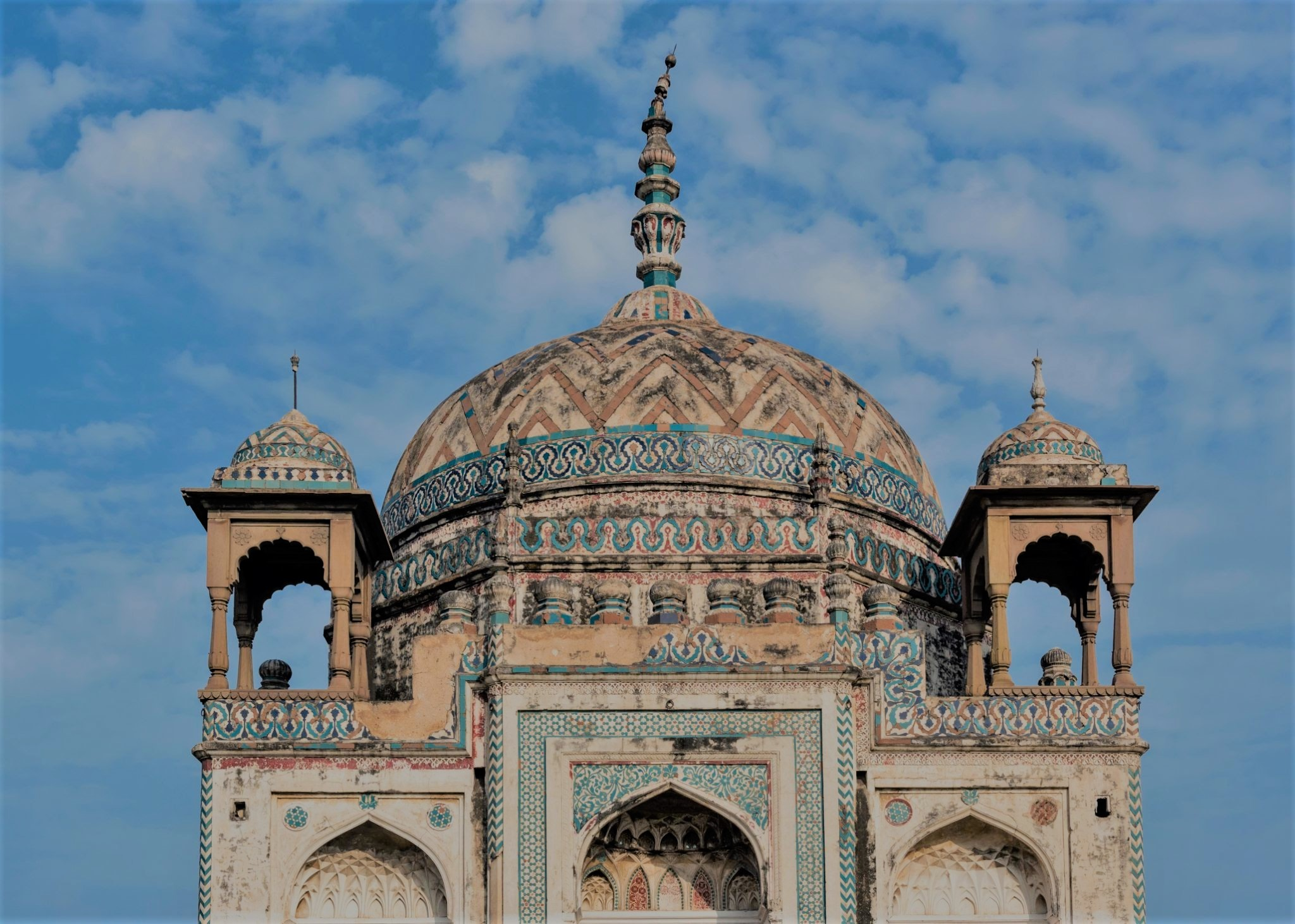
Tomb of Lal Khan

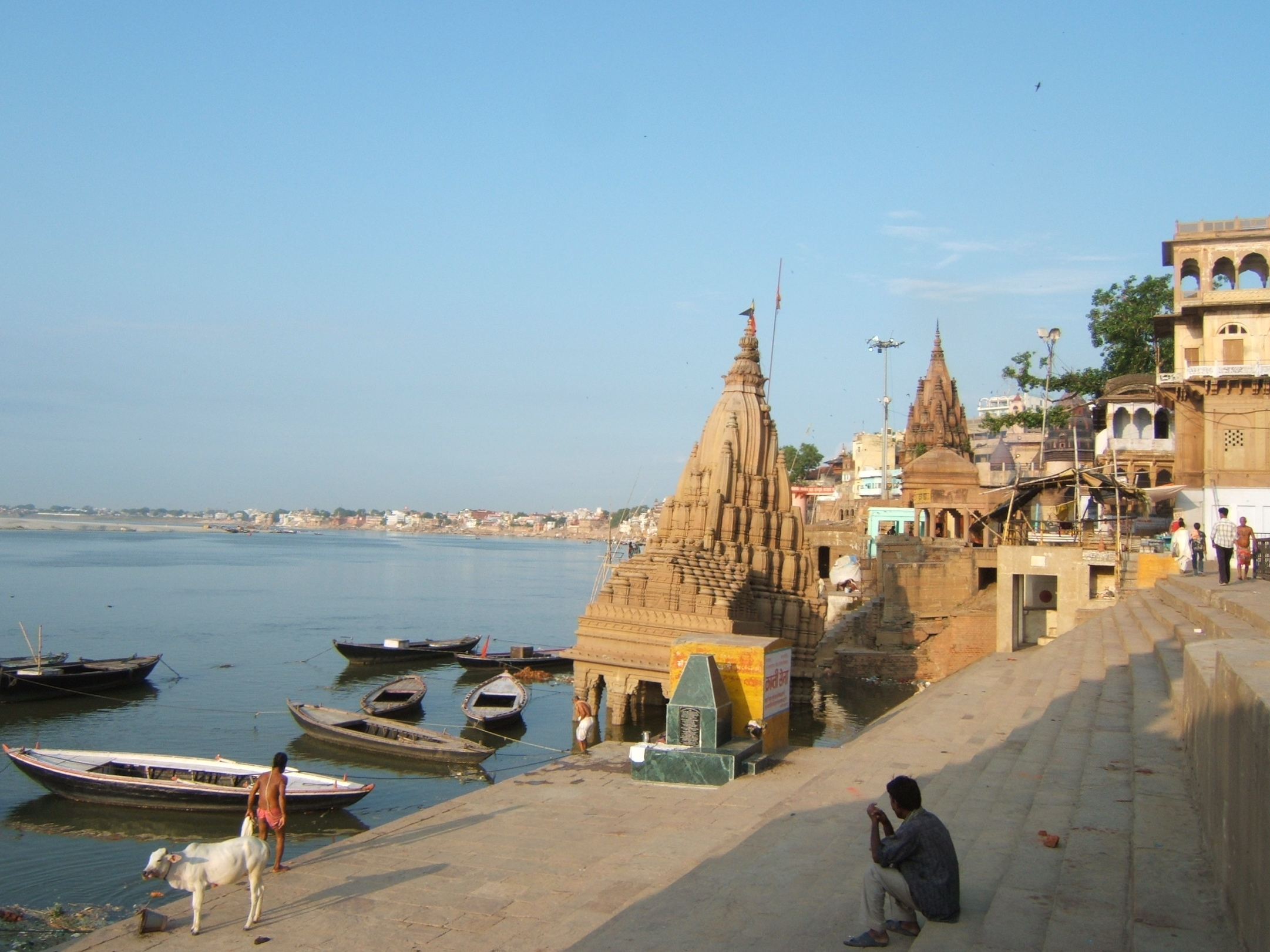
Scindia Ghat

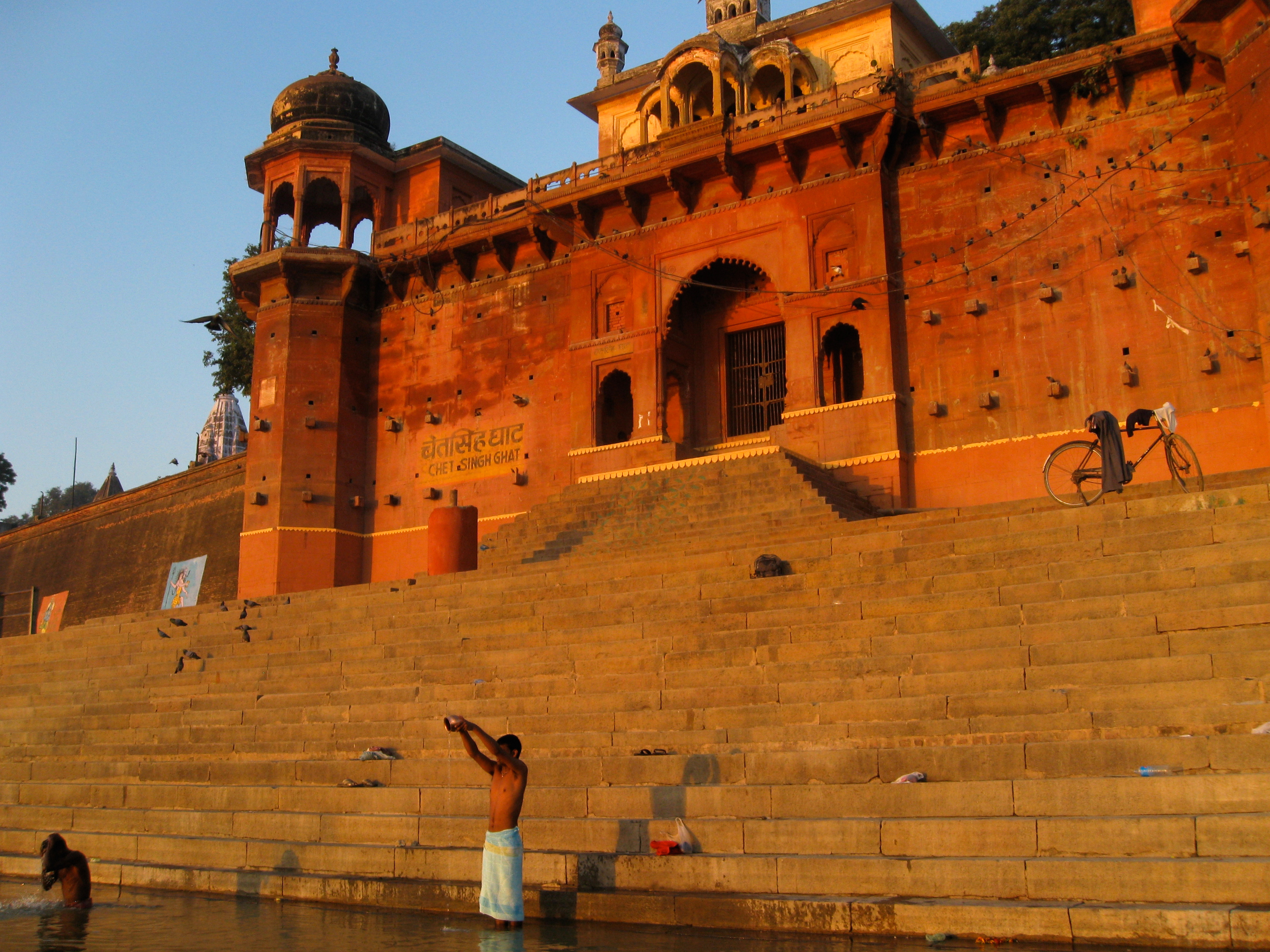
Chet Singh Fort

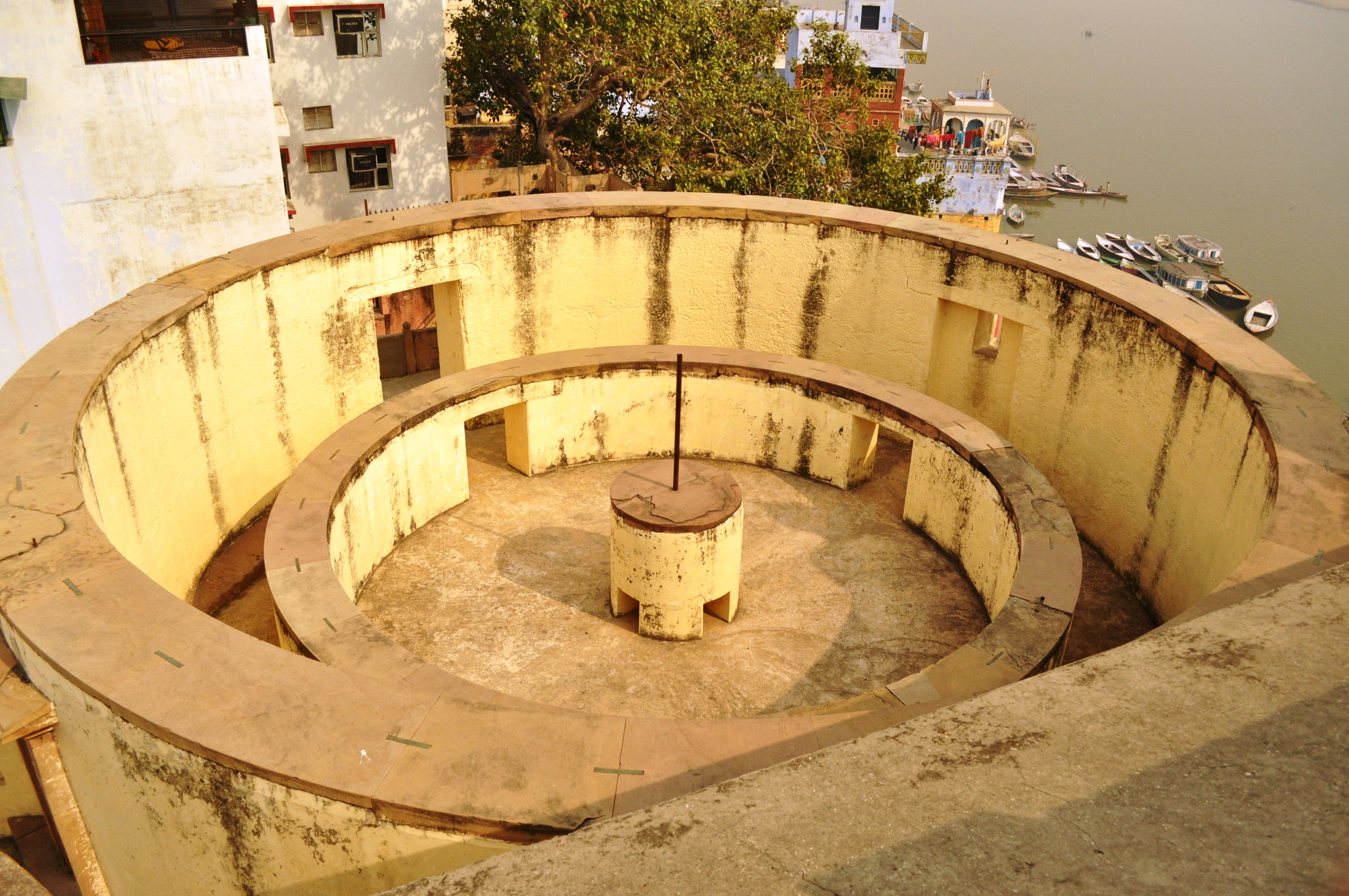
Man Mahal Observatory

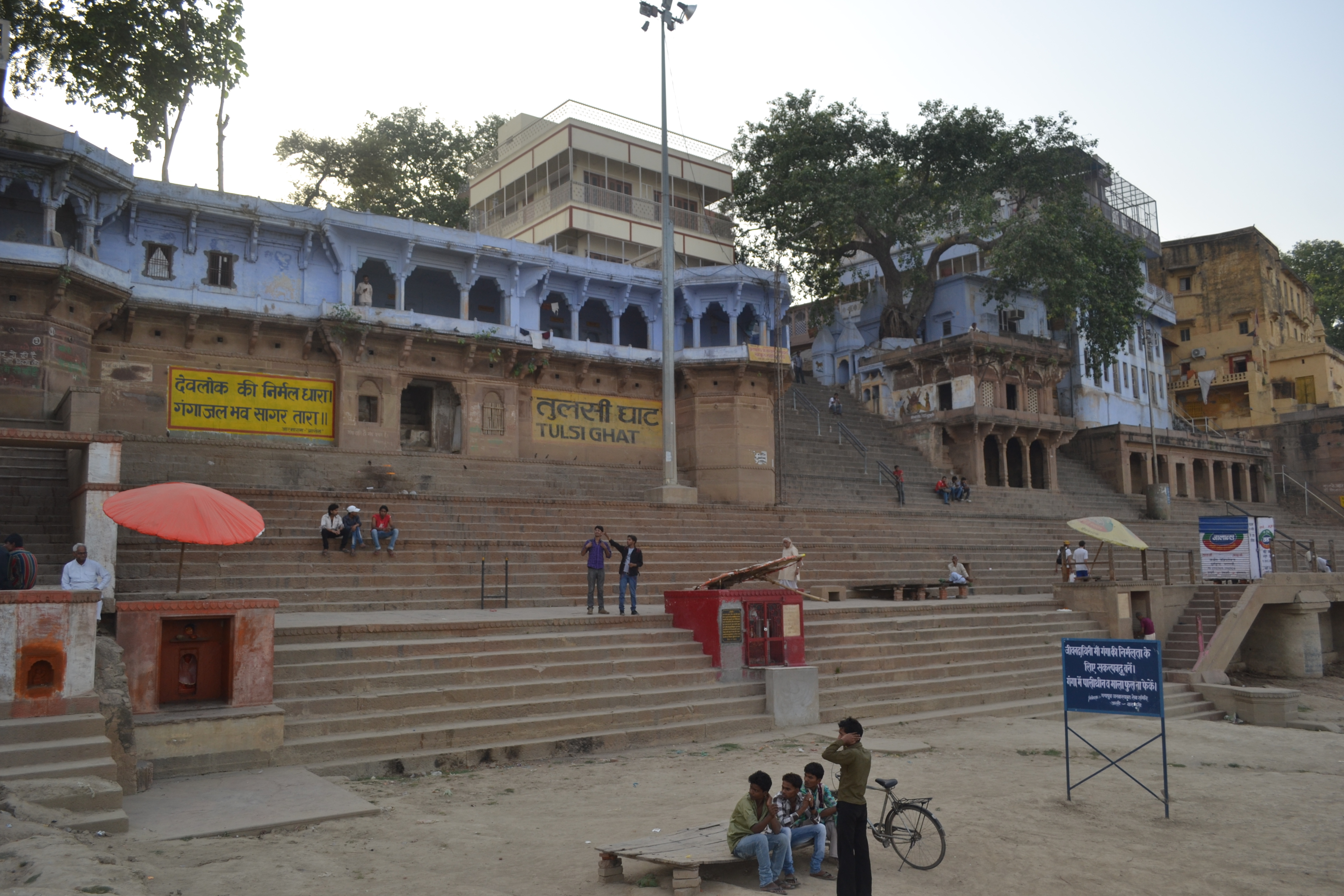
Tulsi Ghat

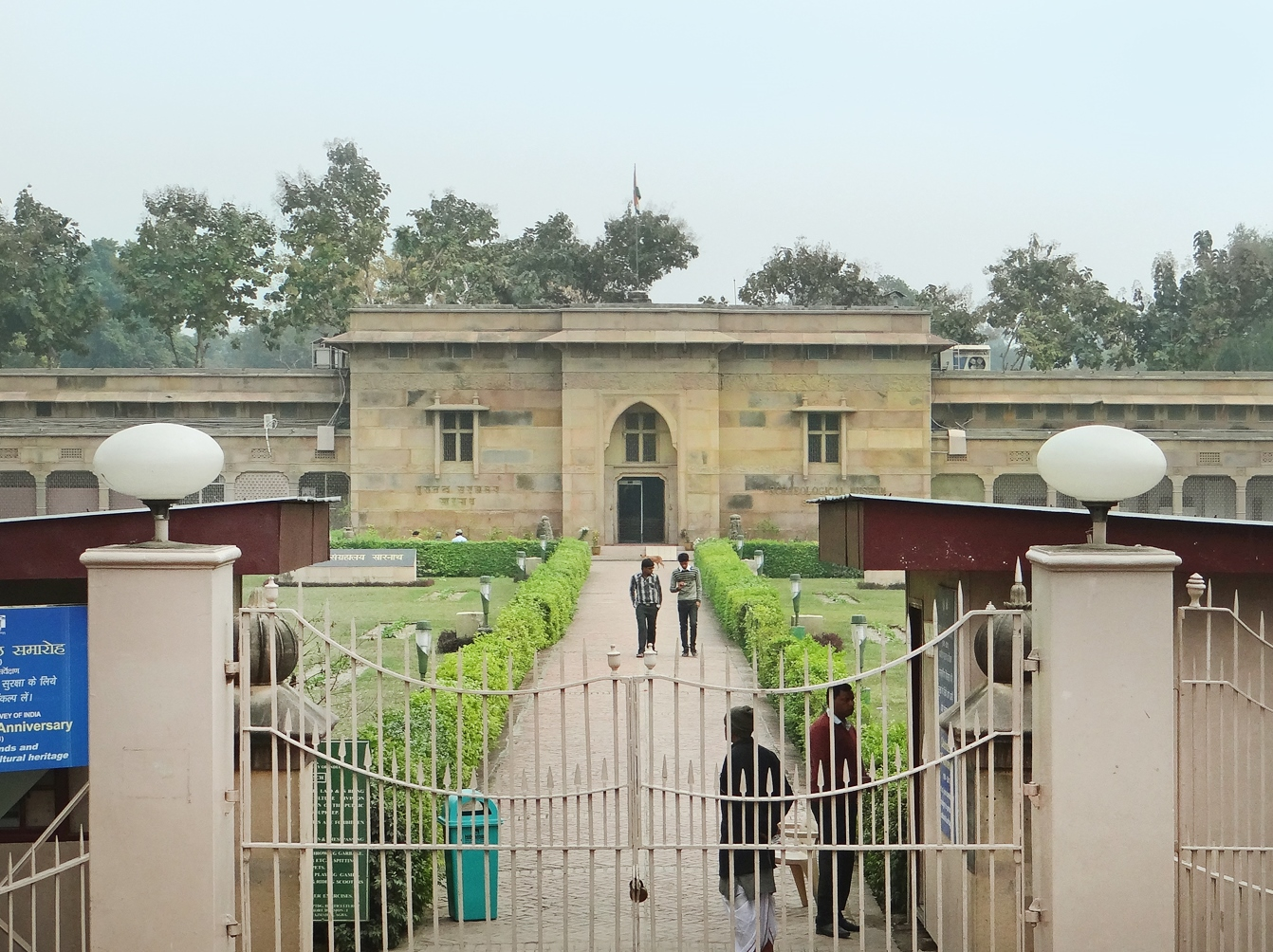
Sarnath Museum

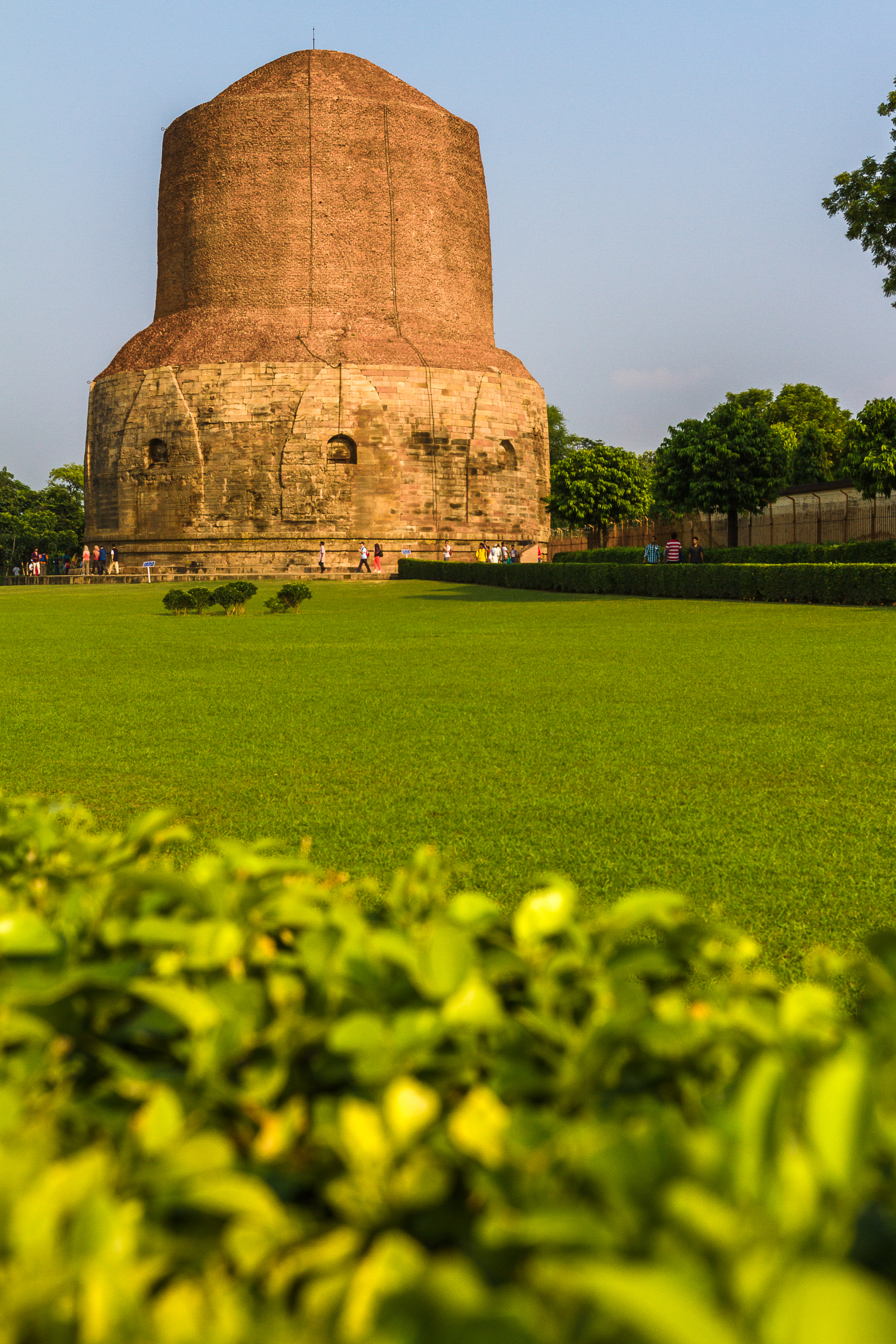
Dhamek Stupa, Sarnath

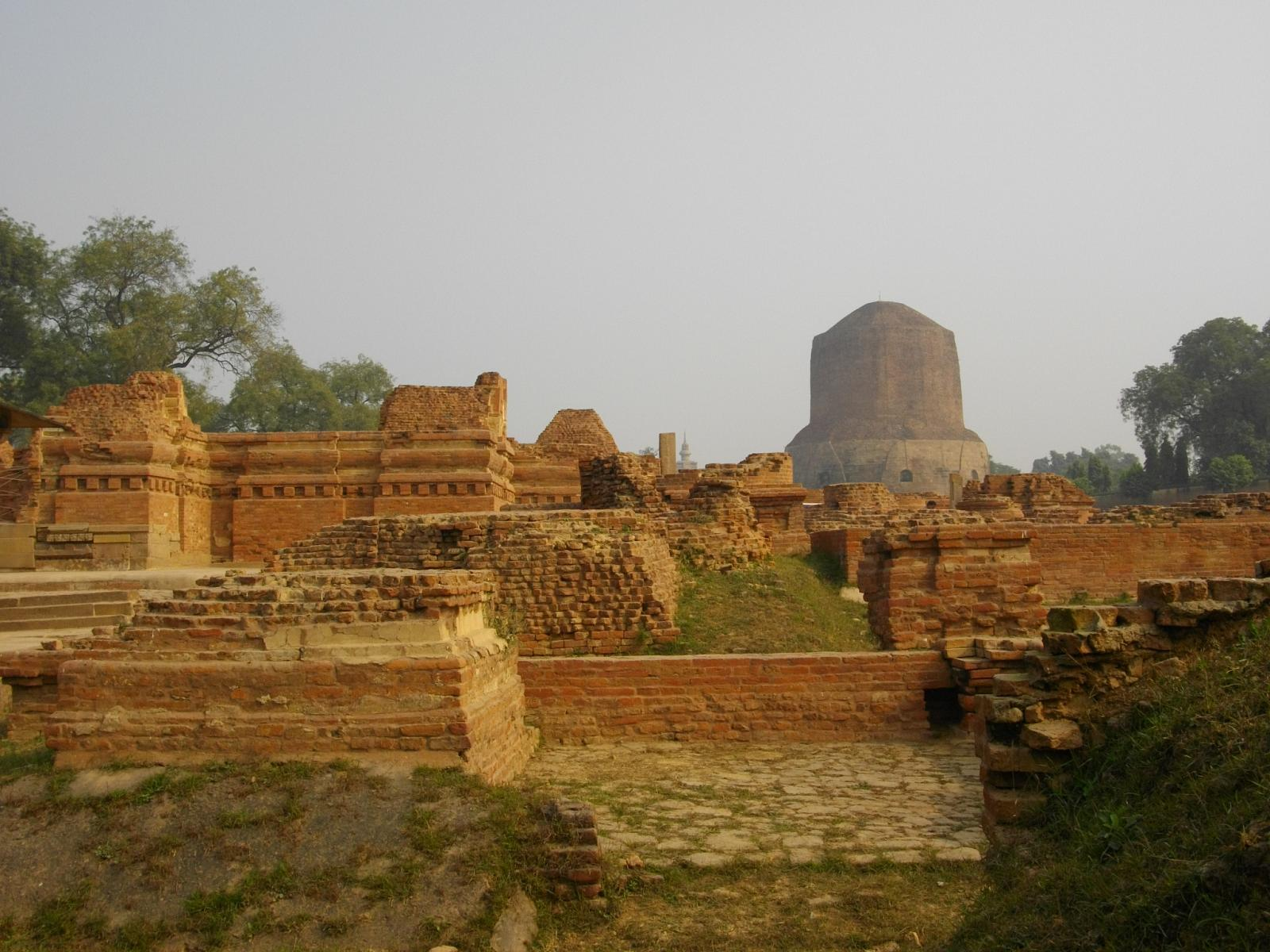
Archaeological Buddhist Remains, Sarnath

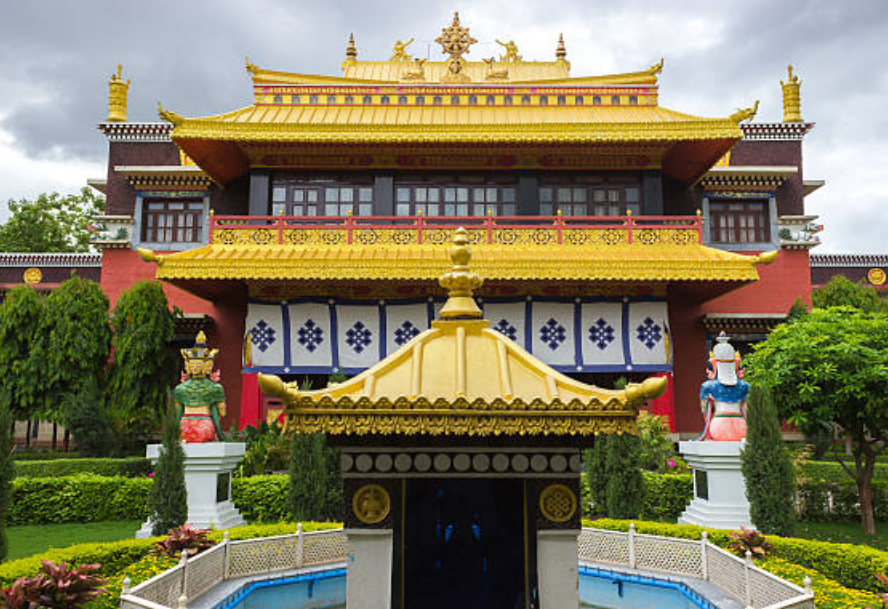
Golden Temple, Sarnath

=== Etawah and Saifai ===
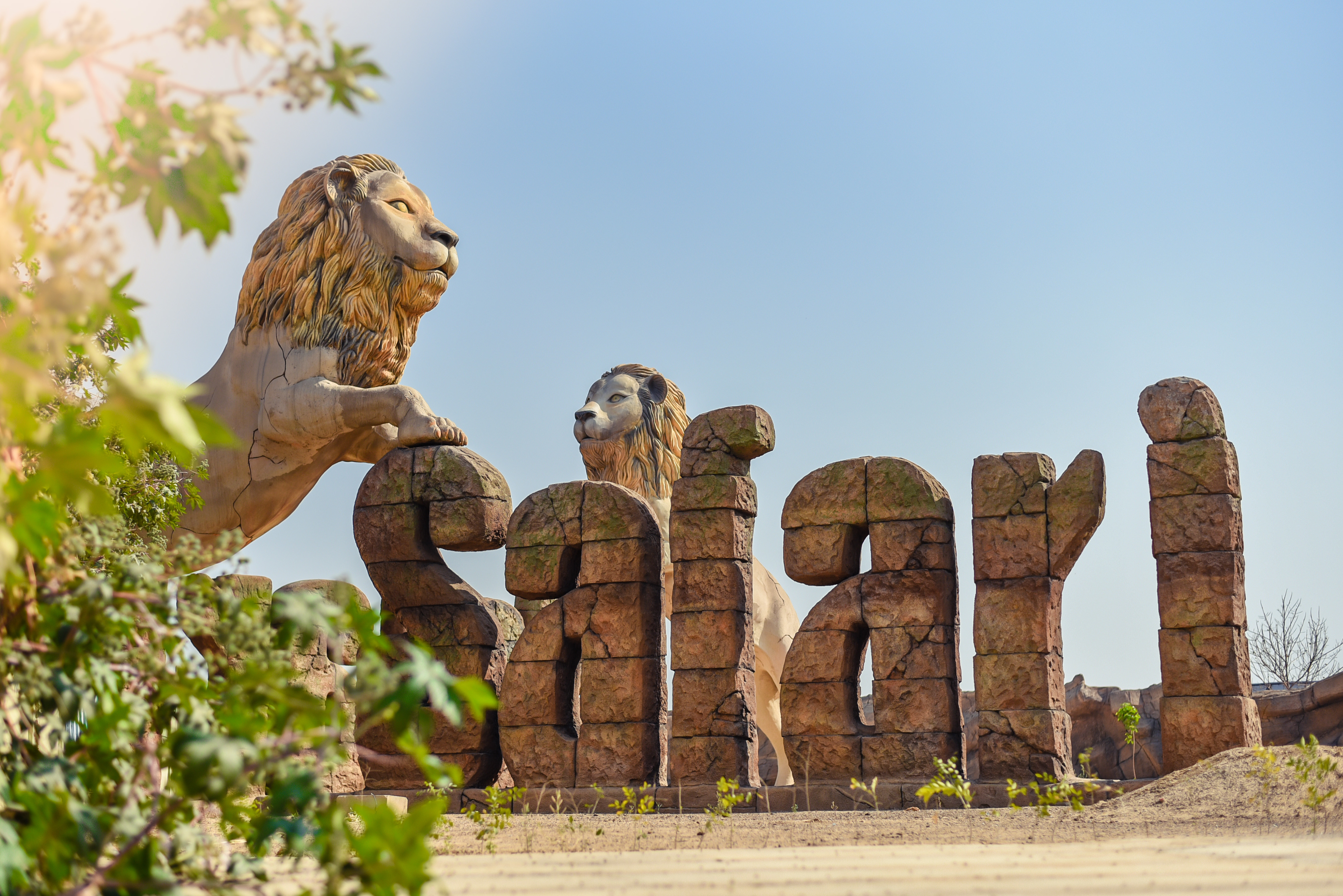
Etawah Safari Park's entrance

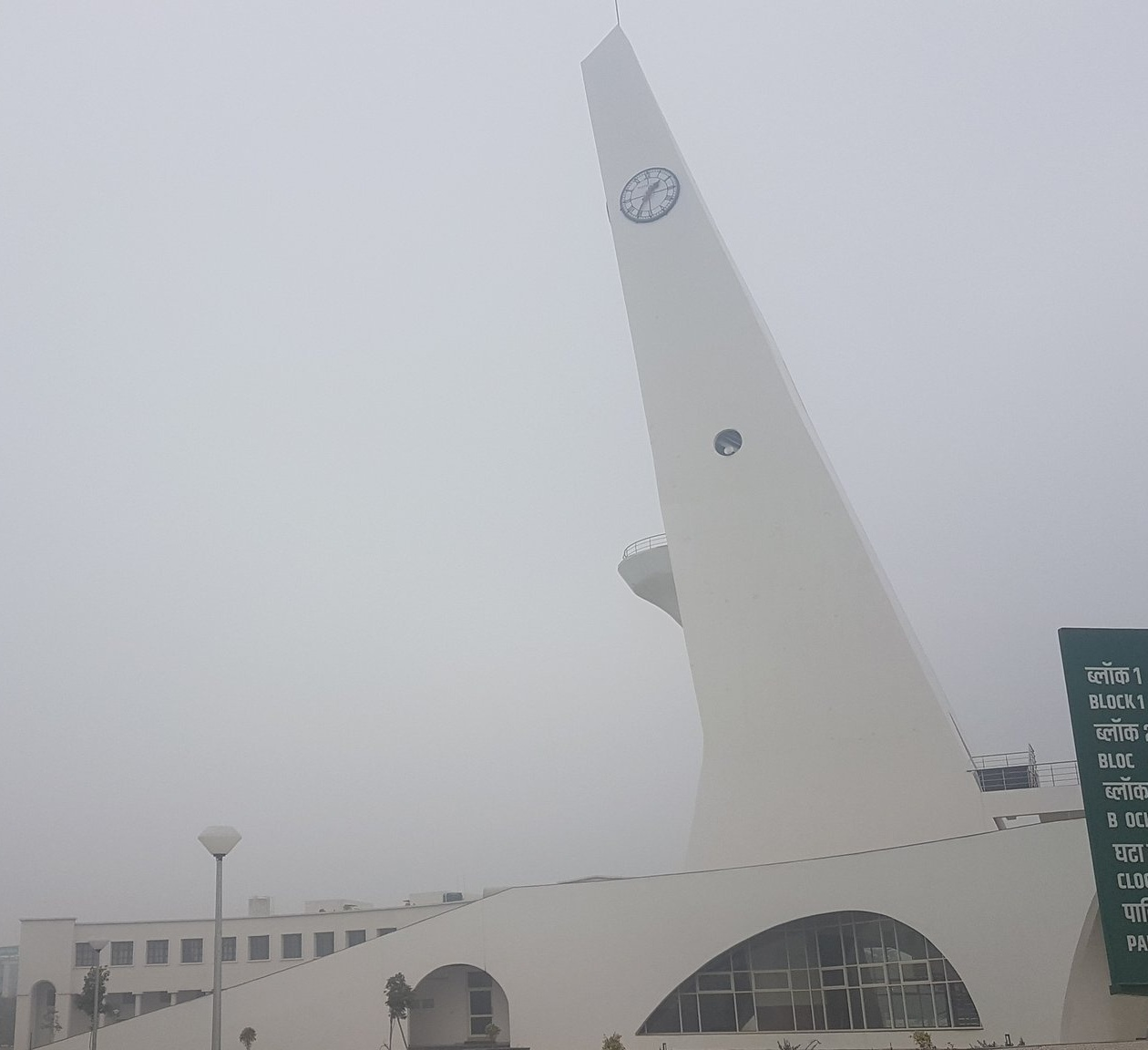
Saifai Clock Tower

== See also ==
- List of tourist attractions in Varanasi
- List of tourist attractions in Allahabad
