= Priti =

Priti may refer to:

- Priti (goddess), a Hindu deity
- Priti (name), a given name
- Priti, Nepal, a village in Nepal
- Pīti or Priti, a stimulating mental factor in Buddhism

== See also ==
- Preeti (disambiguation)
- Pretty (disambiguation)
- Preti, Italian surname
