= Sanat Kumara Chakravarti =

Character within Jain cosmology

Sanatkumara Chakravarti is a figure in Jain universal history, described as the fourth Chakravartin of the present descending half-cycle of time, or avasarpiṇī. He is also counted as one of the twenty-four Jain Kamadevas, a class of exceptionally beautiful men in Jain universal history. In Jainism Kamadevas are praised mainly for extraordinary bodily beauty rather than for power over desire.

== Place in Jain universal history ==
Sanatkumara belongs to the Jain series of twelve Chakravartins, universal monarchs who appear during a half-cycle of time. He is listed after Maghavan and before Shantinatha, Kunthunatha and Aranatha, the three later Chakravartins who are also Tirthankaras.

The Tiloyapannatti, an important Digambara cosmographical text, also includes Sanatkumāra among the twenty-four Kamadevas of the present avasarpiṇī. In this list, he appears after Agniyukta and before Vatsaraja, making him the eighth Kamadeva in the sequence.

== Life in Jain narratives ==
=== Birth and kingship ===
The Digambara Uttarapurana identifies Sanatkumara as the son of King Anantavīrya of Vinitanagara, also identified with Ayodhya, and Queen Sahadevī. Other Jain retellings give a different genealogy, naming him as the son of King Aśvasena of Hastinapura or Gajapura and Queen Sahadevī.

Later narrative traditions add a romantic and adventurous account of his youth. In these stories, Sanatkumāra is educated in the royal arts, becomes separated from his companions after riding an untrained horse to Lake Mānasa, faces troubles and battles, marries Vidyādhara princesses, and is made king of the Vidyadhara. His friend Mahendrasimha later finds him and brings him back to his kingdom. After his father renounces worldly life, Sanatkumāra succeeds him and becomes Chakravartin.

=== Beauty and renunciation ===
A famous story explains both Sanatkumara's Kamadeva status and his later renunciation. Because of his extraordinary beauty, two gods, sometimes described as appearing in the guise of Brahmins, come to see him. They first see him after a wrestling match, before he has bathed or dressed in royal ornaments and praise his appearance. Proud of this praise, Sanatkumāra asks them to wait until he appears in full royal splendour. When he returns after bathing and dressing, the gods no longer praise him in the same way. Instead, they remind him that the body is impermanent and subject to decay. This lesson causes Sanatkumāra to reflect on the instability of physical beauty and royal pride, after which he renounces worldly life and accepts ascetic vows.

=== Disease and refusal of treatment ===
Another well-known ascetic episode concerns Sanatkumāra's illnesses after renunciation. Jain texts describe him as being afflicted by many diseases while practising austerities. In the Vasudevahiṇḍī and related accounts, Indra visits him disguised as a physician and offers treatment. Sanatkumāra refuses, preferring to endure the results of his own karma rather than remain attached to the body. Some versions add that he possessed powers by which he could have cured himself, but he refused to use them for bodily comfort.

=== Final state ===
The ending of Sanatkumāra's story differs by textual tradition. The Digambara Uttarapurana states that Sanatkumāra attained liberation, or moksha; K. R. Chandra notes that Puṣpadanta's Digambara Mahapurana agrees with this account. Other Jain traditions, including accounts related to the Paumacariya, instead say that after performing austerities and enduring disease, he was reborn in the Sanatkumāra heaven.

== Literary tradition ==
The story of Sanatkumāra circulated in several Jain works, including the Maraṇasamāhi, Vasudevahiṇḍī, Paumacariya, the Digambara Uttarapurana, Puṣpadanta's Mahapurana, and later retellings such as Hemacandra's Triṣaṣṭi-śalākā-puruṣa-caritra. In 1157 CE, the poet Śrīcandra of the Candragaccha composed a long Sanatkumāra-carita of 8,127 verses, giving the story a more romantic and supernatural form.
