= Rijal (surname) =

Nepalese family name

Rizal (Rijal) (Nepali: रिजाल) is a surname that belongs to the Brahmin community of people in Nepal. It is believed that the surname originated from Riju Valley, a valley in Jumla. The Nepali word riju means 'brave'. They are a part of the Khas Brahmin community. Dhananjaya is the Gotra associated with this surname. Rizals carry out their Diwali on the Baisakh Purnima. Even though its origin is thought to be from Jumla, a western district of Nepal, many of the Rizals are inhabitants in eastern Nepal as well. Most Rizals, who live in Eastern Nepal, are thought to have migrated there from Dhankuta after migrating to Dhading from Jumla. Apart from Dhading, a few of the Rizals also migrated to the Pokhara & Parbat district of Nepal.

== Notable people with the surname ==
- Abhishek Rijal, Nepalese football player
- Minendra Rijal, Former Minister, Nepali politician and current member of the house of representatives
- Nagendra Prasad Rijal, former Nepalese Prime Minister
- Priti Rijal, Nepalese tennis player
- Raju Rijal, Nepalese cricketer
- Tek Nath Rizal, Bhutanese politician of Nepalese descent
