= Preeti =

Hindu female name

- Gender: Female
- Language: Sanskrit

Origin
- Origin: Via Sanskrit प्रीति
- Meaning: "pleasure", "kindness", "grace", "love", "Light"
- Region of origin: Nepal, India, Bangladesh

Other names
- Alternative spelling: Preety, Preity, Priti, Prethy

Preeti, also: Preethi, Preety, Preity, Priti, or Prethy, is a female given name in India.

== Etymology ==
The name Preeti is derived from the Sanskrit word "प्रीति" (prīti), meaning "pleasure", "joy", "kindness", "favor", "grace", "love", from प्री (prī). Priti is the name of the second consort of the Hindu god of love, Kamadeva.

== Preeti in Indian languages ==
- Assamese: প্রীতি
- Bengali: প্রীতি
- Bhojpuri: प्रीति
- Bishnupriya Manipuri: প্রীতি
- Gujarati: પ્રીતિ
- Hindi: प्रीति
- Kannada: ಪ್ರೀತಿ
- Maithili: प्रीति
- Malayalam: പ്രീതി
- Marathi: प्रीती
- Nepali: प्रीति
- Punjabi: ਪ੍ਰੀਤਿ
  - Western Punjabi: پریتی
- Tamil: பிரீத்தி
- Telugu: ప్రీతి

== Notable people named Preeti ==
- Preeti Amin (born 1967), Indian television actress and reality show participant
- Preeti Bose (born 1992), Indian cricketer
- Preeti Desai (born 1984), Indian actress, supermodel and former winner of 2006 Miss Great Britain
- Preeti Dimri (born 1986), Indian cricketer
- Preeti Dubey (born 1998), Indian field hockey player
- Preeti Ganguly (1953–2012), Indian actress
- Preeti Jhangiani (born 1980), Indian actress
- Preeti Kaur (born 1981), Indian-Nepalese singer
- Preeti Mistry, English-born American chef
- Preeti Sagar, Indian Bollywood playback singer
- Preeti Shenoy (born 1971), Indian writer
- Preeti Singh (born 1971), Indian writer and editor
- Preeti Sudan (born 1960), Indian politician and Health Secretary of India
- Preeti Tomar (born 1970), Indian politician and member of the Delhi Legislative Assembly

== Notable people named Preity ==
- Preity Zinta (born 1975), Indian film actress and model

== Notable people named Preethi ==
- Preethi Asrani (born 1999), Indian actress in Telugu and Tamil films and television
- Preethi Nair (born 1971), British author of Indian heritage
- Preethi Sharma, Indian actress in Tamil and Telugu television
- Preethi Srinivasan (born 1979) Indian cricketer for Tamil Nadu
- Preethi Varma, Indian actress in Tamil cinema
- Radhika Preethi (born 1997), Indian actress in Tamil films and television

== Notable people named Priti ==
- Priti Menon (born 1985), Indian model, singer and psychologist
- Priti Paintal (born 1960) Indian composer, performer, producer and promoter
- Priti Patel (born 1972), British politician, MP and minister
- Priti Rijal (born 1991), Nepali tennis player
- Priti Sapru (born 1957), Indian actress
- Priti Sengupta (born 1944), Indian Gujarati poet and writer
- Priti Shankar (1947–2011), Indian teacher, researcher, and educationist

== Fictional characters ==
- Preeti Choraria, from British soap opera EastEnders
- Preeti the Prom fairy, from British book series Rainbow Magic

== See also ==
- Preethi 1972 Indian Malayalam-language film
- Preeti & Pinky, Indipop duo singers
