= Kamadeva =

Hindu god of love

- God of Love, Desire, Attraction, Pleasure and Beauty
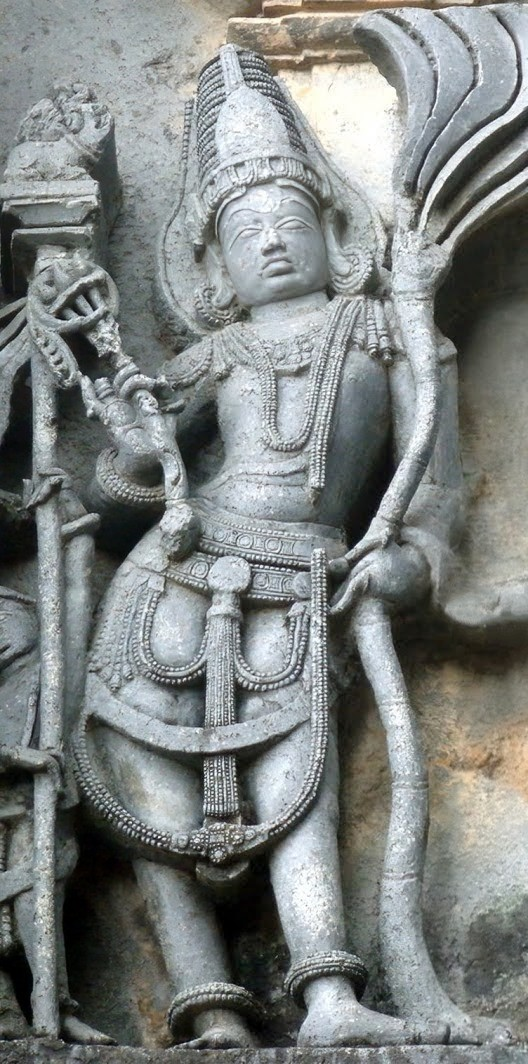
- Sculpture of Kamadeva on a temple wall of Chennakesava Temple, Belur
- Other names: Manmatha, Madana, Ananga
- Devanagari: कामदेव
- Sanskrit transliteration: Kāmadeva
- Venerated in: Hinduism, Jainism
- Affiliation: Deva, Jainism
- Abode: Kamaloka
- Mantra: काम (kāma)
- Weapon: Sugarcane bow and floral arrows
- Symbol: Makara
- Mount: Parrot
- Texts: Atharvaveda, Ramayana, Mahabharata, Harivamsha, Puranas, Upāṅga Āgamas
- Gender: Male

Genealogy
- Parents: Brahma (father) (Note: Kama is mentioned as one of Brahma's mind born sons in the Puranas. In the Harivamsha, he is the son of the prajapati Dharma and his wife Lakshmi. Some traditions consider Kama (as Pradyumna) as the son of the god Vishnu (as Krishna) and his wife Lakshmi (as Rukmini).)
- Consort: Rati (Note: In some scriptures, Kama has a second consort named Priti.)
- Children: Harsha and Yasha (sons)

Equivalents
- Greek: Eros
- Roman: Cupid

Kamadeva (Sanskrit: कामदेव, IAST: Kāmadeva), also known as Kama, Manmatha, and Madana is the Hindu god of love, attraction, pleasure and beauty, as well as the personification of the concept of kāma. He is depicted as a handsome young man decked with ornaments and flowers, armed with a bow of sugarcane and shooting arrows of flowers. He is often portrayed alongside his consort and female counterpart, Rati.

Kamadeva's origins are traced to the verses of the Rig Veda and Atharva Veda, although he is better known from the stories of the Puranas. The Atharva Veda regards Kamadeva as a powerful god, the wielder of the creative power of the universe, also describing him to have been "born at first, him neither the gods nor the fathers ever equaled".

In the Puranas, Kamadeva is generally mentioned as a manasaputra (mind-born son) of the creator god Brahma. His most popular myth is his incineration by the god Shiva's third eye and rebirth on earth as Pradyumna, the eldest son of Krishna and his chief consort Rukmini.

== Etymology and other names ==
The name Kama-deva (IAST: kāma-deva) can be translated as 'god of love'. Deva means heavenly or divine and refers to a deity in Hinduism. Kama (IAST: kāma) means "passion" or "longing", especially as in sensual or passionate love. The name is used in the Rigveda (RV 9, 113. 11). Kamadeva is a name of Vishnu in the Vishnu Purana and the Bhagavata Purana (SB 5.18.15). It is also a name of the deities Krishna and Shiva. Kama is also a name used for Agni (Atharva Veda 6.36.3).

Other names prominently used about Kamadeva are:

- Kama (काम) - passion; longing.
- Manmatha (मन्मथ) - one who agitates mind.
- Madana (मदन) - one who intoxicates with love.
- Mara (मार) - he who wounds.
- Ananga (अनंग) - he who is without a body.
- Kushumeshara (कुसुमशर) - he whose arrows are flowers.
- Pradyumna (प्रद्युम्न) - he who conquers all. It is also the named of Kama's reincarnation.
- Kandarpa (कन्दर्प) or Darpaka (दर्पक) - the inflamer. Brahma gave him this name.
- Manasija (मनसिज), Manoja (मनोज) and Bhavaja (भवज) - he who is born of mind.
- Ratikanta (रतिकांत) or Ratipati (रतिपति) - husband of Rati.
- Abhirupa (अभिरूप) - the beautiful one. Also a name for both Vishnu and Shiva.

== Evolution ==
Kamadeva's origins can be traced back to the ancient Vedas, from where kāma evolved from an impersonal and conceptual force of desire into a fully developed deity.

=== Vedas ===
The earliest references to the concept of desire, later personified as Kamadeva, appear in the Vedic Samhita—Rigveda and Atharvaveda, where the notion of kāma is presented primarily as an abstract cosmic principle rather than a fully developed deity. These early Vedic texts reflect the formative stages of Kamadeva’s mythological identity. John Muir notes that Kama in the Vedas does not refer to the sexual desire, but rather desire of goodness in general.

In Rigveda 10.129, often referred to as the Nasadiya Sukta or the Hymn of Creation, kāma emerges as a primordial force central to the cosmogonic process. The hymn portrays a state of indistinguishable darkness and undifferentiated water, out of which desire (kāma) arises as “the first seed of mind.” Linguist Franklin Edgerton interprets this kāma as a "cosmic Will" or an impersonal force essential to the evolution of the universe. In this early context, kāma is not yet personified but rather functions as an abstract principle vital to creation itself, linking non-existence with existence through mental conception.

In the Atharvaveda, Kāma begins to take on a more defined, divine character. In hymn 9.2, Kāma is invoked to grant desires and eliminate rivals. The deity is described with titles such as “first seed of mind” (manoja, mind-born one), echoing his Rigvedic origins. The supplicant praises Kāma’s superiority over gods, ancestors, and mortals. According to Professor Catherine Benton of the Lake Forest College (Department of Religion), this form of Kāma is simultaneously a divine agent of desire and a god with cosmic significance. Hymn 19.52 of the Atharvaveda continues this theme, offering homage to Kāma as a bestower of prosperity and success, likely in connection with sacrificial rites. Again, Kāma is described as “the first seed of mind,” indicating continuity with the Rigvedic view of desire as a force foundational to creation. Benton observes that in these contexts, Kāma functions not as a romantic deity but as a divine principle invoked to fulfill a variety of human wishes, from wealth to progeny.

A significant shift toward the later mythological depiction of Kamadeva appears in Atharvaveda 3.25. This hymn illustrates Kāma in a form more closely resembling the god portrayed in the epics and Puranas. The verses describe the use of Kama’s arrows to arouse intense desire in a woman:

“May the up-thruster thrust you up; do not abide in your own lair;

with the arrow of kāma that is terrible I pierce you in the heart.” (AV 3.25.1)

“The arrow feathered with longing, tipped with love [kāma],

necked with resolve, let love pierce you in the heart.” (AV 3.25.2)

While early translators interpreted kāma here as “love,” Benton argues that the term more accurately reflects desire, especially one linked to resolve and intensity. The supplicant in these verses does not merely seek affection but calls upon Kāma to awaken powerful desire within the target of his attraction. This early association of Kāma with arrows—referred to as “terrible” and capable of burning the heart—marks one of the first identifiable characteristics of Kamadeva as he is depicted in later Sanskrit literature. While 20th-century scholar A. Berriedale Keith considered the text reflective of the "lower side" of religious life, contemporary scholars emphasize its appeal across all societal strata. Its rituals and charms—for success, fertility, and personal protection—suggest that figures like Kamadeva, even in rudimentary form, would have been recognizable and culturally significant to a broad audience.

=== Brahmanas ===
In the Brahmanas, the term kāma is primarily used to denote generic desire, particularly in the context of sacrificial rites. According to Benton, although some stories in the Brahmanas touch on themes of sexual pleasure, these do not establish kāma as a divine being. Across these texts, kāma remains a concept—used to articulate motivations, wishes, and preferences—rather than an anthropomorphic deity. (Note: In the Śatapatha Brāhmaṇa, kāma is frequently linked to the fulfillment of wishes through proper ritual. One passage explains that the desires (kāma) entertained by the rishis during sacrifice were fulfilled, and likewise, the desires of any sacrificer who performs the same rites will be accomplished. Another section reiterates this idea in relation to offerings made to Prajāpati: the sacrificer’s desires are said to be fulfilled through the ritual process. In both instances, kāma functions as a term for aspiration or hoped-for outcome, without divine personification. Similarly, the Jaiminīya Brāhmaṇa employs kāma in discussions of rituals such as the agnihotra, describing the offering as a path toward achieving “all things one may desire.” Here, too, kāma remains an abstract term indicating a wide range of human wants and goals. The Brahmanas also contain an adverbial form of the word, kāmanam, meaning "at will" or "as one pleases." In the Jaiminīya Upaniṣad Brāhmaṇa, for instance, students are advised to abstain from certain foods but may “eat with pleasure” what is offered by their teacher—underscoring the term’s broad semantic range, including but not limited to physical or sensual gratification.)

A notable verse in the fourth khaṇḍa of the Śatapatha Brāhmaṇa—closely echoing Atharvaveda 3.29.7—states: “Desire has given to desire; desire is the giver, desire the receiver.” Although this formulaic expression may suggest a symbolic exchange involving kāma, Benton cautions that it should not be read as evidence of a fully developed god of desire. No further references in the Śatapatha support a personified interpretation.

John Dowson, however, states that in the Taittiriya Brahmana, Kama appears as a deity, described as the son of deities Dharma (righteousness personified) and Shraddha (faith personified).

=== Mahabharata ===
Kamadeva, also known by names such as Kandarpa, Manmatha, Smara, and Madana, appears both as a mythological deity and as a personified philosophical concept of desire in the Hindu epic Mahabharata. While kāma continues to be discussed in philosophical terms, Kamadeva evolves from a symbolic representation of desire into a fully personified deity with mythological significance. (Note: The Śānti Parvan features an extended discussion among the Pandava brothers and Vidura on the hierarchy of life's four aims (puruṣārthas): dharma (duty), artha (wealth), kāma (pleasure or desire), and mokṣa (liberation). The Mahābhārata also often links Kāma (desire) with Krodha (anger), presenting them as paired forces—kāmakrodhau—that represent two facets of human impulse. Benton observes that these dual forces are seen as major obstacles to self-mastery, appearing throughout the Ādi, Śānti, and Anuśāsana Parvans. They are embodied as powerful, almost invincible figures, subdued only by sages such as Vasishtha through ascetic discipline. In one passage, the warrior Ashvatthama is described as born from parts of Shiva, Yama (Death), Kama, and Krodha, embodying desire, rage, and destruction.)

In the Adi Parva, Kamadeva is firmly personified, attested as the son of Dharma and the husband of Rati. This lineage situates Kamadeva within a divine genealogy.

Philosophy and mythology blend throughout the Mahabharata in depictions of Kamadeva. As a metaphysical force, he is immortal and pervasive, described in the Kāmagītā verses as saying, “None can destroy me… I am the one immortal and indestructible.” At the same time, he remains a poetic embodiment of desire, armed with his arrows—a motif first seen in the Atharvaveda—which are said to bring madness, ecstasy, and suffering. The epic often portrays victims of desire as struck by “the sharp arrows of Manmatha,” emphasizing the emotional and psychological impact of passion. For instance, the princess Amba is described as tormented by Kāma’s arrow when rejected by beloved Shalva (Mahabharata 5.172.8). Kamadeva also becomes a figure of metaphor in the epic. Exceptionally attractive men, such as the hero Nala (Mahabharata 3.50.14), are described as physical embodiments of Kamadeva, emphasizing the god’s role as a symbol of irresistible beauty and desire.

The Udyoga Parva locates Kāma in the northern direction, the domain of Shiva and Uma (Parvati) at Mount Kailash. His presence in this region stirs divine passion, further solidifying his cosmological relevance. Moreover, in the Shanti Parva, Kamadeva appears in an allegorical episode as Virūpa (“ugly”) alongside Krodha (anger) as Vikṛta (“distorted”), in a philosophical debate that explores the dynamic between spiritual giver and worldly receiver. In one passage, the warrior Ashvatthama is described as born from parts of Shiva, Yama (Death), Kama, and Krodha, embodying desire, rage, and destruction.

A pivotal reference to Kamadeva's transformation appears in Mahabharata 12.183.10.5, which states: “Also the universal lord, the husband of Umā, when Kāma was getting the better of him, subdued him by making him bodiless.” Though the account is brief, it alludes to the later, fuller myth of Shiva incinerating Kāma with his third eye. This marks the emergence of the epithet Ananga (“the bodiless one”) and symbolizes the conflict between ascetic detachment and sensual desire. In the Anushasana Parva, Kamadeva is further elevated as a dharaṇīdhara—an upholder of the earth—and is philosophically associated with saṅkalpa, or mental intention. Bhishma lists Kāma among seven such cosmic sustainers, including Dharma and Time. This passage preserves an older Vedic conception of desire not merely as a temptation but as a generative and sustaining principle. Additional metaphysical insights are found in Mahabharata 13.84.11, where Kāma is equated with saṅkalpa, described as “For everlasting intention is called desire; it is Rudra’s vigor which leapt out and fell in the fire.” This verse connects Kāma to the myth of Skanda’s birth, in which a drop of Shiva’s seed—infused with creative will—is identified with Kāma.

=== Ramayana ===
In the other epic Ramayana, Kamadeva—appearing under the names Kandarpa and Manmatha—retains his role as the divine embodiment of love and desire. He is known for his power to disturb minds and kindle longing, attributes evident in his epithets: Manmatha (“mind-disturber”) and Madana (“intoxicator”). One of the most prominent mentions of Kamadeva in the Ramayana is his influence over Rama. After his wife Sita's abduction, Rama is described as being overcome by longing and mental distress. He becomes kāmavaśaṃgata—overpowered by love—and “perpetually absorbed in thought and sorrow” (R 5.36.41f.).

The Ramayana also alludes to the well-known myth of Kamadeva’s incineration by Shiva, a narrative that becomes more elaborated in later literature. In R 1.23.12f. and R 3.56.10, references are made to Shiva burning Kamadeva to ashes after the latter attempted to disturb his meditation. Despite his annihilation, Kamadeva endures in a disembodied form, earning the epithet Ananga (“the bodiless one”). His continued power despite his destruction reflects his lasting presence as an unseen but potent force of emotional compulsion.

Kamadeva’s symbolic attributes also appear subtly throughout the text. Rati, his consort, is mentioned as the embodiment of physical desire and erotic longing. In R 5.15.29, she is explicitly identified as the wife of Madana, solidifying her mythological pairing with Kamadeva. Later passages describe metaphors that liken a lover’s body to a battlefield marked by the fiery assault of Manmatha’s arrows, as when a character pleads for the “fire of love” to be “extinguished by the rain of self-surrender” (R 4.14.25f.).

Though more implicit than explicit, Kamadeva’s influence pervades the Ramayana through its emotional tenor and imagery. In one verse, Rama remarks that the sight of dancing peacocks stirs feelings of desire within him (R 4.1.37), a subtle allusion to the peacock’s later association with Kamadeva’s iconography.

=== Puranas ===
In the later Hindu mythological texts such as the Harivamsha and Puranas, Kama is fully personified, where he is depicted as the mind-born god of desire, a figure renowned for his ability to ignite passion in all beings and for his dramatic incineration by Shiva's gaze. By the seventh century CE, Kamadeva was already well established in Indian oral and literary traditions.

He is explicitly identified as the "lord" (prabhu) of the Gandharvas and Apsarasas (Hariv. 270; 12499), reinforcing his association with celestial sensuality and artistic charm. This attribution situates Kamadeva not merely as a personification of desire but as a ruler of those divine beings most emblematic of beauty and seduction.

The text links Kamadeva to the divine genealogy of Krishna by identifying Pradyumna—son of Krishna and Rukmiṇī—as a manifestation of Kāma (1.67.152), and Aniruddha, Pradyumna’s son, as the “son of Rati” (H 10064). This generational link illustrates a philosophical and mythological identification, extending Kamadeva’s presence into the dynastic narrative of Krishna's lineage.

== Mythology ==
=== Birth ===
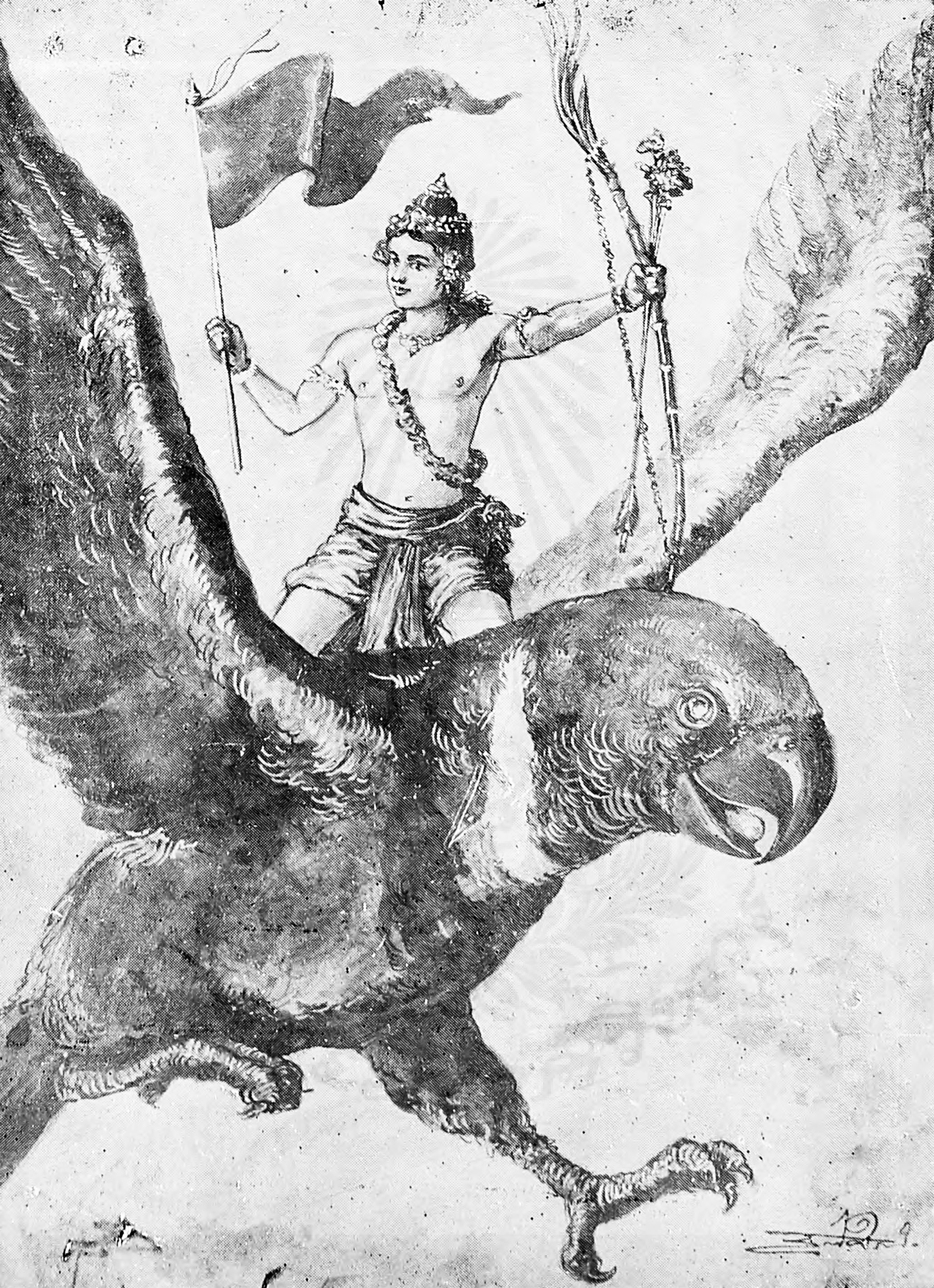
A Thai depiction of Kamadeva riding a parrot, 1959

The story of the birth of Kamadeva has several variants in different Hindu scriptures.

In early scriptures, including the Taittiriya Brahmana and the Mahabharata, Kamadeva is described as the son of Dharma, the personification of righteousness and a Prajāpati (progenitor deity). According to the Mahabharata, Dharma is said to have been born from Brahma’s right breast and fathered three sons: Shama (tranquility), Kama (desire), and Harsha (joy). Kama's mother is mentioned to be Dharma's wife Shraddha in Taittiriya Brahmana, while the appendix of the Mahabharata, Harivamsa, states his mother to be Lakshmi, another wife of Dharma. (Note: Distinct from the consort of Vishnu who has the same name.)

According to Puranic scriptures including the Shiva Purana, the Kalika Purana, the Brahma Vaivarta Purana, and the Matsya Purana, Kama is one of the mind-born sons of the creator god Brahma. In the most common narrative, after Brahma creates all the prajapatis (agents of creation) and a maiden named Sandhya, an extremely handsome and youthful man emerges from his mind and enquires Brahma about the purpose of his birth. Brahma names him Kama and orders him to spread love in the world by shooting his flower arrows. Kama decides to first use his arrows against Brahma and shoots him with his floral arrows. (Note: In the Kalika Purana, Kama also shoots at the prajapatis, and later from the sweat of Daksha, Rati emerges.) He becomes attracted to Sandhya and desires for her. The prajapati Dharma becomes worried by this and calls the god Shiva, who watches them and laughs at both Brahma and Kama. (Note: In some versions, the role of Dharma is absent. Instead, Shiva sees them while traveling there.) Brahma regains consciousness and curses Kama to be burnt to ashes by Shiva in the future. However, on Kama's pleading, Brahma assures him that he will be reborn. (Note: In some texts like the Matsya Purana and Brahmanda Purana, a different name is used for Sandhya.) A later version of the myth is found in the Skanda Purana, according to which, Brahma creates Kama from his mind to ignite passion in the prajapatis (agents of creation) after they refused to procreate. (Note: In this version, Kama is cursed by Brahma as he initially ignores his orders.)

In some traditions, Kama is considered a son of the goddess of wealth Lakshmi, and the preserver god Vishnu due to his birth as Pradyumna to Rukmini and Krishna, the incarnations of Lakshmi and Vishnu respectively. According to Matsya Purana, Visnu-Krishna and Kamadeva have a historical relationship.

=== Family and assistants ===
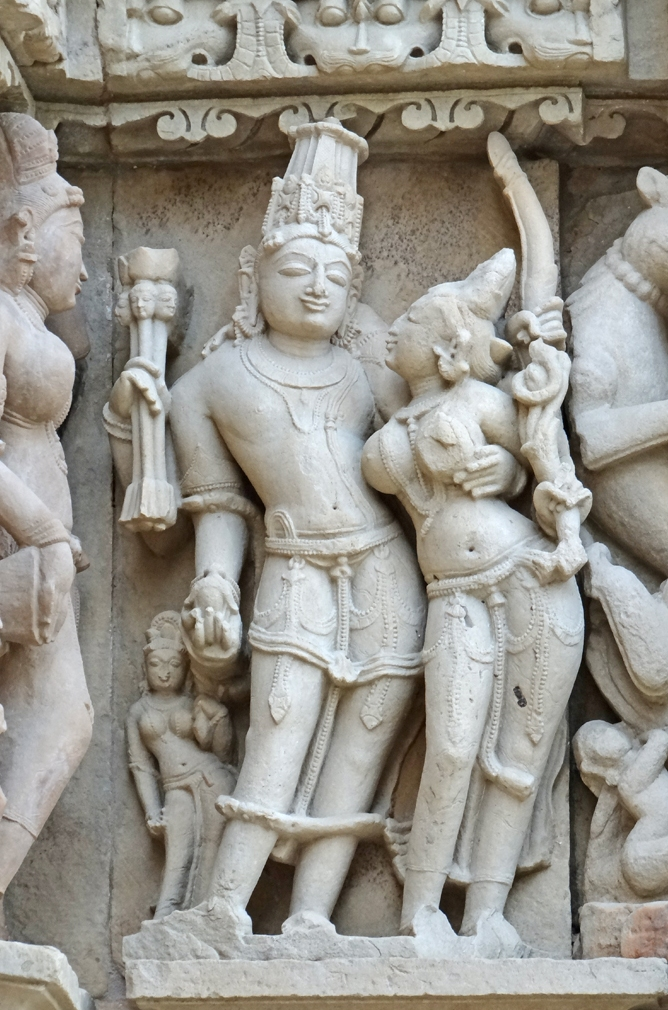
Sculpture of Kama and Rati at Khajuraho

Both the epics and the Puranas attest to the goddess Rati as the consort and chief assistant of Kamadeva. She is his female counterpart representing sensual pleasure. According to Kalika Purana and Shiva Purana, she emerged from a sweat drop of prajapati Daksha who was assigned by Brahma to present Kamadeva as a wife. The Shiva Purana also mentions that Kama himself was pierced by his love arrows when he saw Rati. The Brahmavaivarta Purana gives Rati another origin, according to which Sandhya died after Brahma desired her but was revived as Rati by Vishnu who presented her to Kama. Priti ("affection") is mentioned as Kamadeva's second spouse in the Skanda Purana, while in other texts, 'Priti' is just an epithet of Rati.

In most scriptures, Kama and Rati have two children, Harsha ("Joy") and Yashas ("Grace"). However, the Vishnu Purana mentions that they only have one son – Harsha.

Besides Rati, Kama's main assistant is Vasanta, the god of spring season, who was created by Brahma. Kama is served by a group of violent ganas known as the Maras. Kama also leads the celestial nymphs, the apsaras, and they are often sent by Indra—the king of heaven—to disturb the penance of sages to prevent them from achieving divine powers.

=== Incineration by Shiva ===
The most famous episode of Kama's mythology—his incineration by the ascetic god Shiva's third eye—is often called the Madana-bhasma, also rendered the Kama dahana. This tale is recorded in various Indian texts, including the Matsya Purana, Padma Purana, Shiva Purana, and Vamana Purana. In all versions, Kamadeva is tasked with breaking Shiva's asceticism. Shiva's potential to father a son who could defeat the demon Taraka is the gods' only hope. Taraka's boon of invincibility ensures that only a son of Shiva can kill him, a seemingly impossible task given Shiva's intense ascetic lifestyle after the death of his wife Sati. The gods, led by Indra, summon Kamadeva, the god of desire, to make Shiva fall in love with Parvati, the reincarnation of Sati and the daughter of the mountain god Himavat.

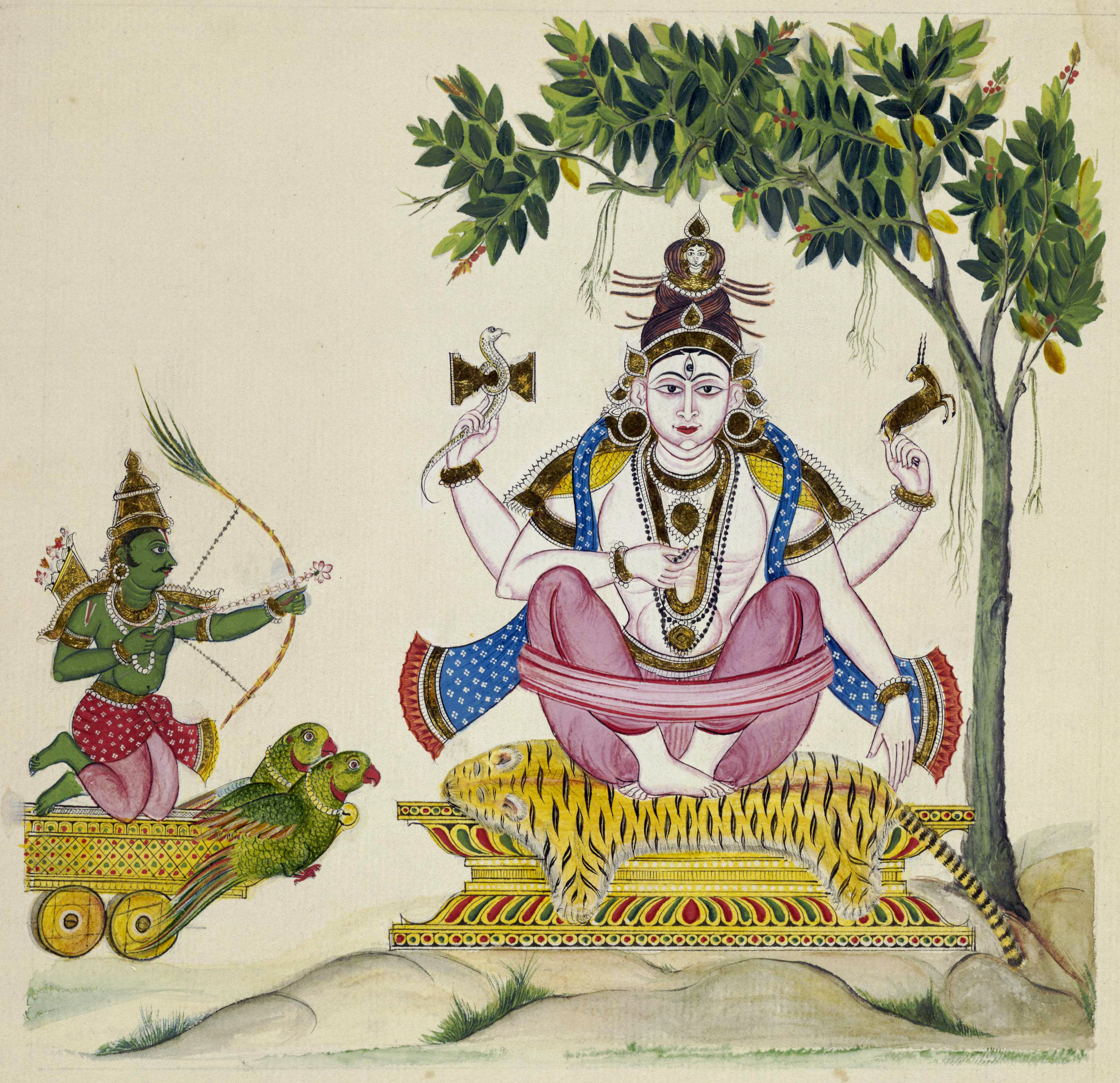
Kama attacks a meditating Shiva, gouache on paper, c. 1820 CE

It occurs in its most developed and earliest form in the Matsya Purana (verses 227–255). In this variant, the gods, desperate for a warrior to vanquish Taraka, send Kamadeva to disrupt Shiva's meditation. Kamadeva, aware of the danger, initially hesitates, fearing that Shiva's wrath will result in his own destruction. Indra, however, reassures him, insisting that this mission is crucial to the survival of the world. Kamadeva prepares carefully for the task. He takes his sugarcane bow and floral arrows, each one symbolizing a particular emotion or aspect of desire. Accompanied by his wife Rati (goddess of pleasure) and the spirit of Spring (Madhu or Vasanta), Kamadeva approaches Shiva, who is deep in meditation. Kamadeva's approach to breaking Shiva's concentration is a calculated multi-stage process. He first begins by targeting Shiva's mind, slowly destabilizing his thoughts. As the god of desire, Kamadeva introduces feelings of envy, hatred, and anger into Shiva's mind—emotions that are traditionally considered the antithesis of spiritual equilibrium. According to the text, Kamadeva strategically stirs Shiva's senses: bees buzz around him, fragrant flowers bloom, and a gentle breeze flows—all aimed at disrupting Shiva's focus. After successfully infiltrating Shiva's mind and senses, Kamadeva escalates his attack by drawing his famous floral arrows. The most potent of these is the Mohana arrow, symbolizing delusion and infatuation. He shoots this arrow directly at Shiva's heart, which momentarily stirs feelings of desire in the god for Parvati. However, Shiva quickly regains his composure and realizes that his ascetic control is being threatened. Enraged by the disturbance, Shiva opens his third eye, from which fire emerges and instantly reduces Kamadeva to ashes. After Kamadeva's death, his wife Rati is devastated by grief and smears his ashes all over her body. Her mourning becomes a significant element of the narrative, as she petitions Shiva to restore her husband. Shiva, moved by her devotion, promises that Kamadeva will return, but not in his previous form. Instead, Kamadeva will be reborn as Ananga—the bodiless one—making him invisible yet still present. This transformation marks a new phase in the existence of desire—it becomes an unseen force, influencing the world in ways that are not immediately visible.

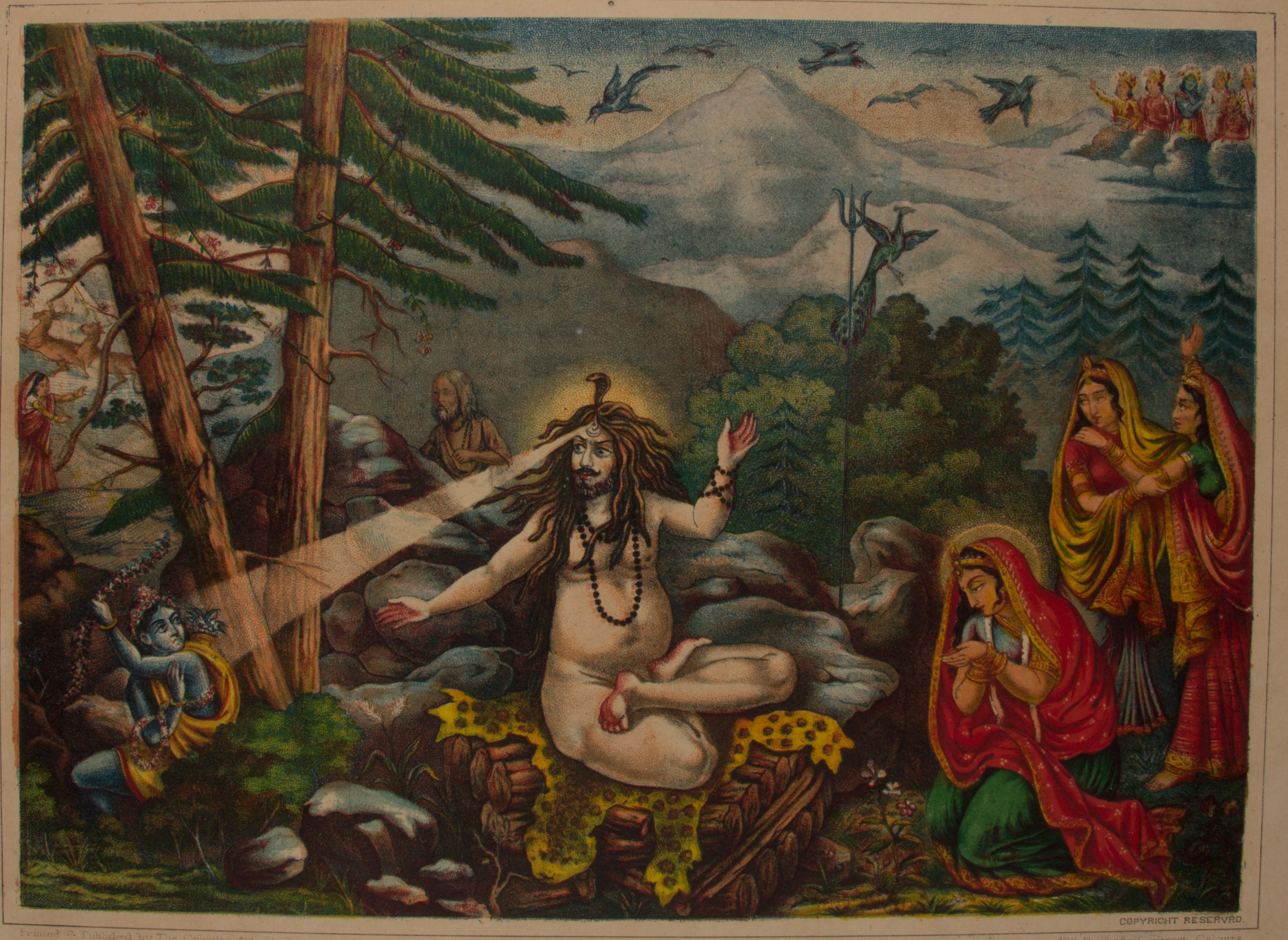
Painting of the Madana-bhasma (Shiva turns Kamadeva to ashes)

While the Matsya Purana provides a foundational version of the story, other texts like the Shiva Purana and the Vamana Purana offer different emphases and additional layers to the myth. In the Shiva Purana, Kamadeva is depicted as more arrogant and powerful, yet his encounter with Shiva further underscores the latter's dominance over desire. Kamadeva's arrows fail to fully penetrate Shiva's concentration, demonstrating the supreme yogi's ability to resist even the most potent forces of passion. However, as in the Matsya Purana, Kamadeva's destruction leads not to the end of desire but to its transformation. Shiva absorbs Kamadeva into himself, making him one of his ganas (attendants). This act symbolizes Shiva's control over desire, yet acknowledges its persistence in a subtler, controlled form; the Shiva Purana thus reinforces the idea that desire is an inherent part of the universe, but under the control of disciplined spiritual practice. The Vamana Purana presents a version in which Shiva is more vulnerable to Kamadeva's arrows. Here, Shiva is grieving for his first wife, Sati, and is emotionally vulnerable when Kamadeva strikes. Overwhelmed by desire and grief, Shiva flees into the forest, seeking to escape Kamadeva's influence. However, the very act of fleeing causes the wives of the forest sages to become infatuated with him, illustrating the uncontrollable nature of desire, even for the gods.

Kalika Purana & Shiva Purana attributes Kama's incineration to him being cursed by Brahma because he shot his first arrows at him & the other mind-born sons of Brahma, which caused Brahma to become incestually enamoured of his daughter Sandhya, for which he is rebuked by Shiva. The maharshis, incestually enamoured of their sister, begin to perspire, which creates the Pitrs. Sandhya, ashamed of her body which incited such forbidden passions, commits suicide & is reincarnated as Arundhati.

In the Lalitopakhyana section of the Brahmanda Purana, from the incinerated remains of Kamadeva, arose the asura Bhandasura.

=== Resurrection ===
Shiva Purana describes Kamadeva being resurrected by Shiva on the event of his marriage to Parvati. However, the Lalitopakhyana describes his resurrection from the eyes (akshi in Sanskrit) of the Goddess Lalita in Kanchipuram, where she resides by the name of Kamakshi. The Kalika Purana states that Kamadeva was resurrected by goddess Kamakhya, (who is also related to Lalita) hence the land of Kamakhya where the Kamadeva regained his rupa (corporeal form in Sanskrit) became known as Kamarupa. In gratitude, Kamadeva constructed the first shrine of Kamakhya.

The death and resurrection of Kamadeva fills in the trope of dying-and-rising god found in other cultures.

=== Incarnations ===
According to Garuda Purana, Pradyumna and Samba - the sons of Krishna, Sanat Kumara - the son of Brahma, Skanda - the son of Shiva, Sudarshana (the presiding deity of Sudarshana Chakra), and Bharata are all incarnations of Kama. The myth of Kamadeva's incineration is referenced in the Matsya Purana and Bhagavata Purana to reveal a relationship between Krishna and Kamadeva. In the narrative, Kama is reincarnated in the womb of Krishna's wife Rukmini as Pradyumna, after being burned to ashes by Shiva.

== Iconography and depictions ==
Depictions of Kama

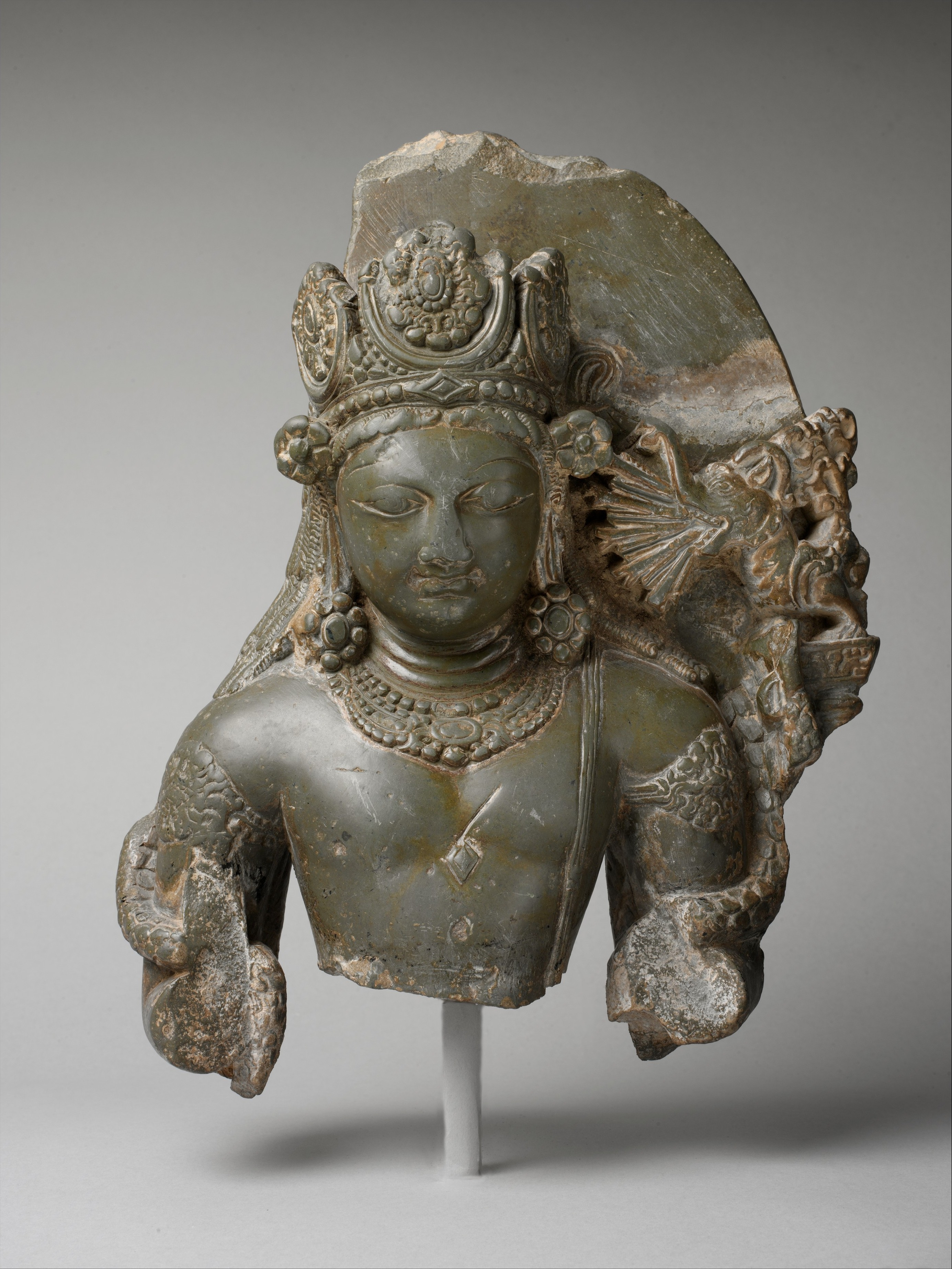
Bust from ancient kingdom of Kashmir, c. 8th century CE

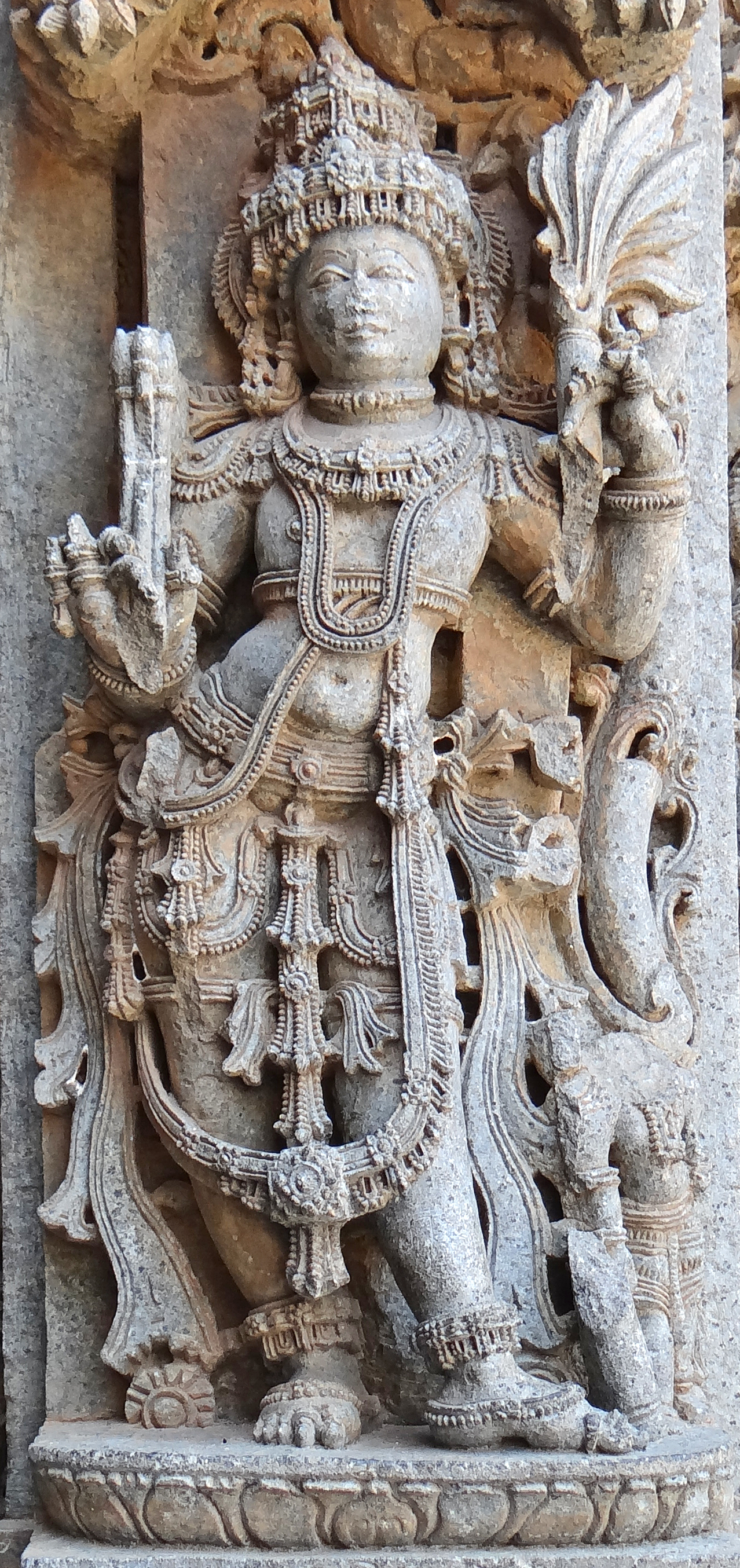
On the Chennakesava temple walls, c. 1269 CE

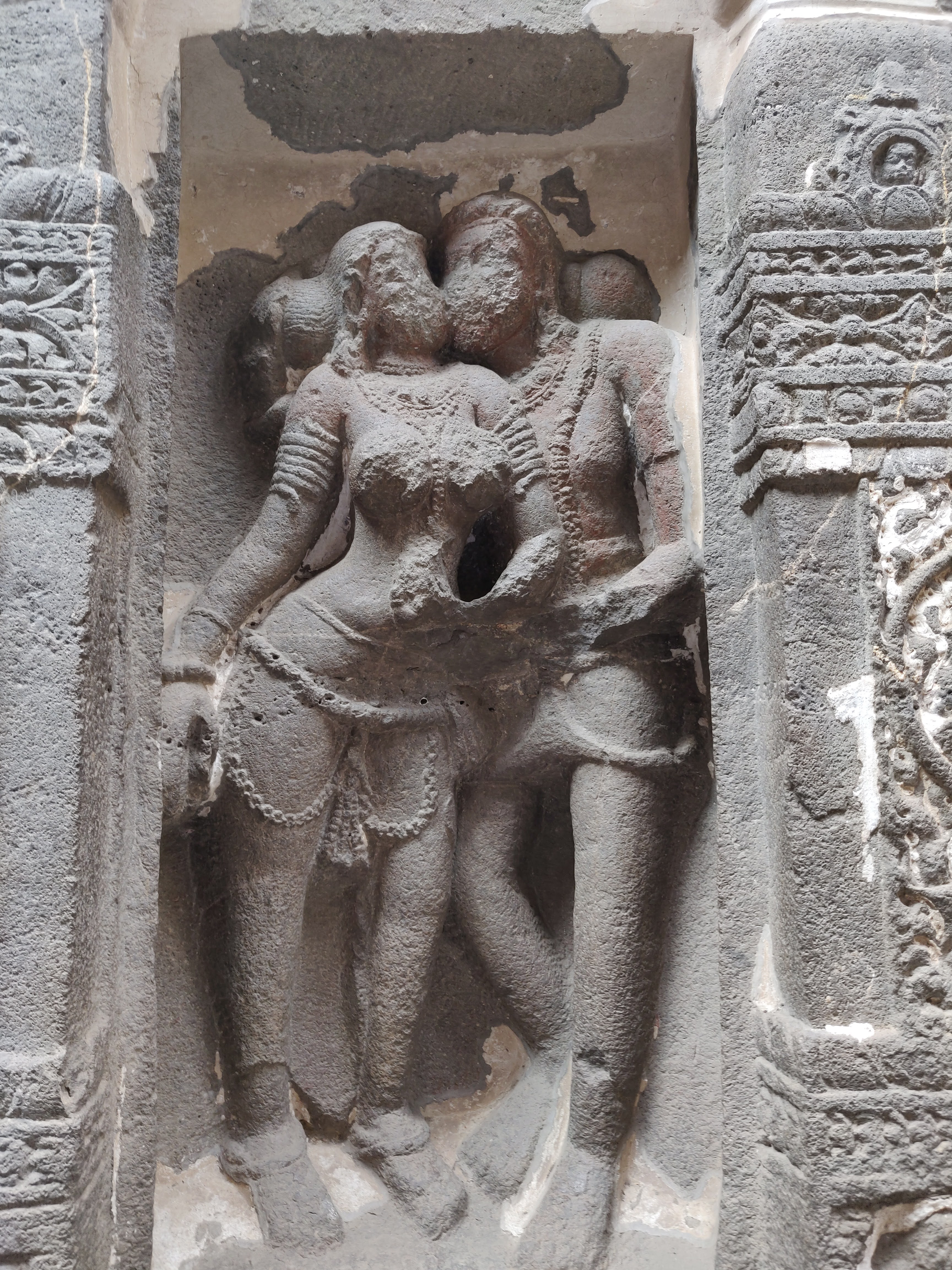
With Rati at Kailasa Temple, Ellora

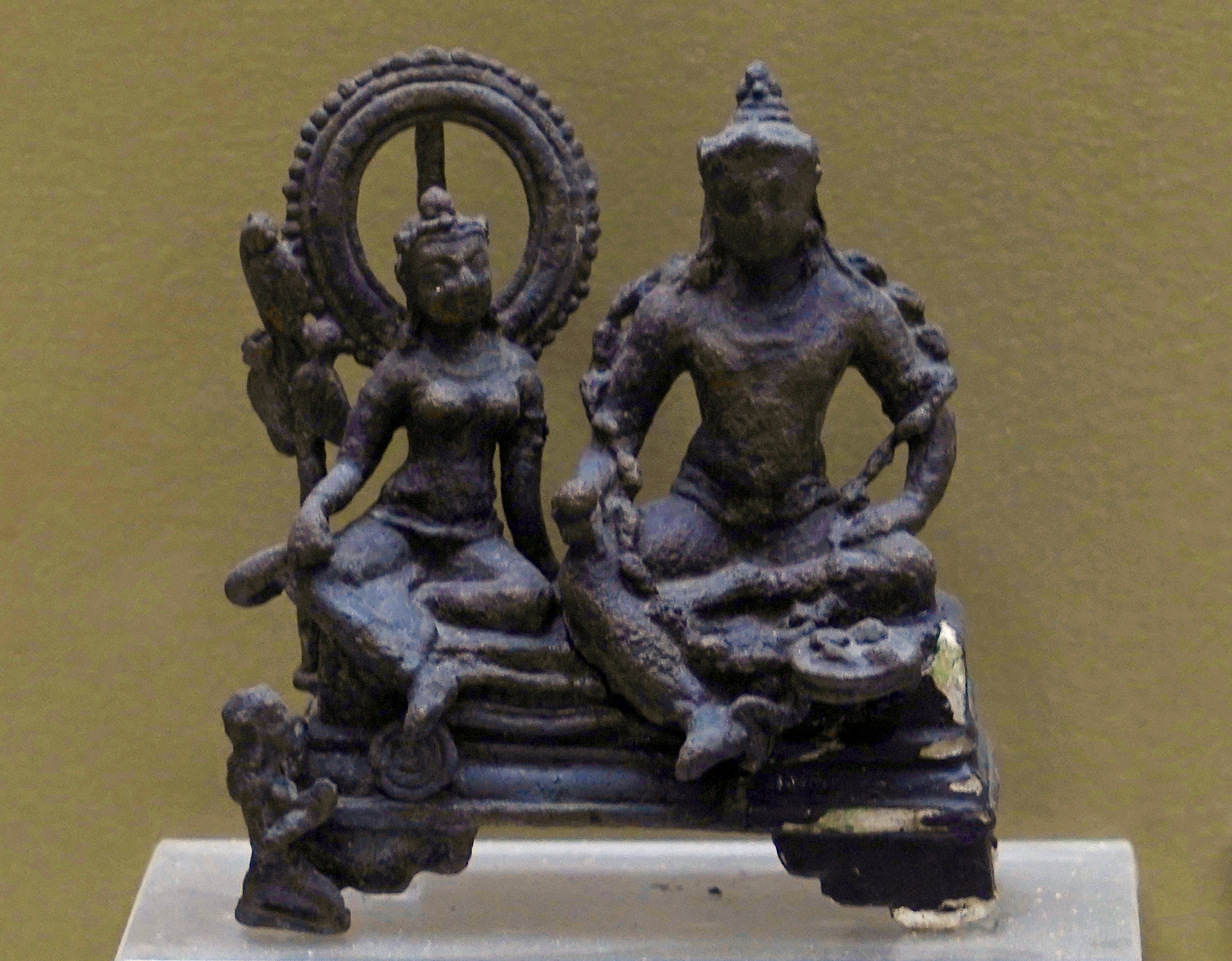
with Rati, from Nalanda c. 9th - 10th cent. CE,

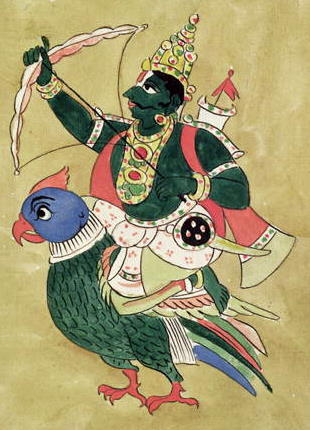
with green skin, c. 18th-19th century

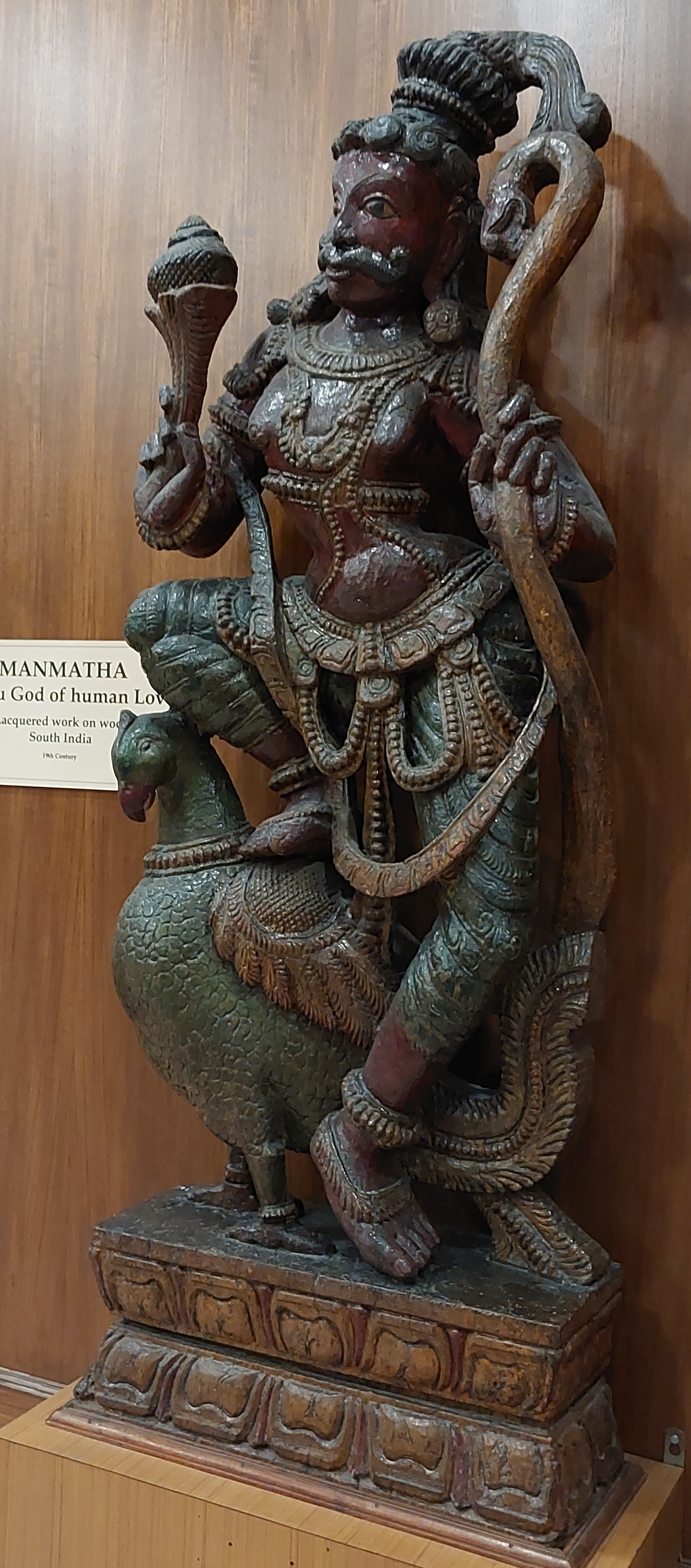
Sculpture at Salar Jung Museum

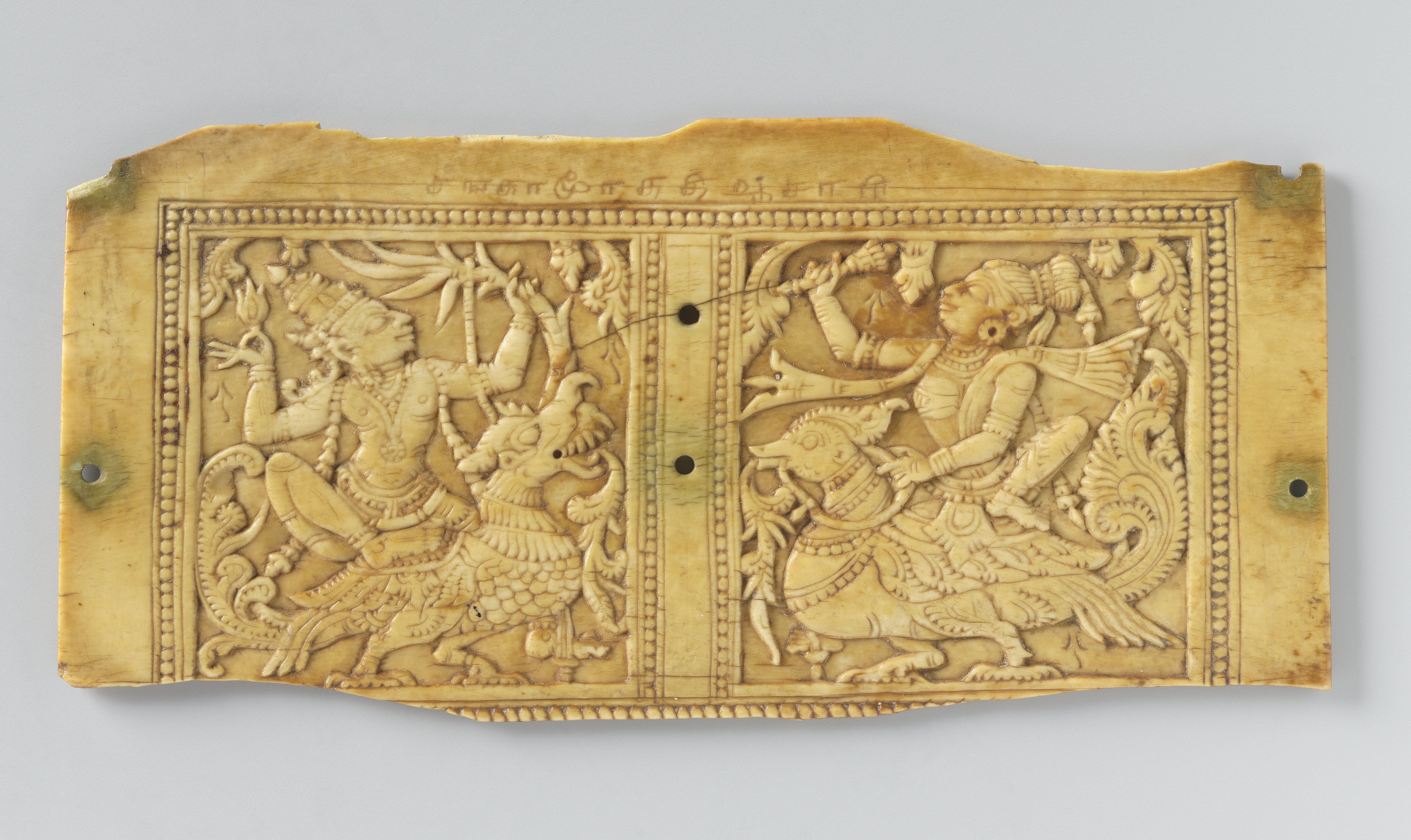
on ivory panel with Rati from Tamil Nadu, c. 1700-1800 CE

Kamadeva is vividly described in the Puranic texts as a radiant and enchanting deity, often regarded as the pinnacle of male beauty. According to the Shiva Purana, he possesses a golden complexion, a broad and muscular chest likened to a doorframe, and well-rounded limbs, including plump thighs and calves. His waist is slender with deep navel, and his entire body is suffused with the intoxicating fragrance reminiscent of an elephant in rut. His features are refined and sensuous—his nose straight and delicate, his eyes shaped like lotus petals and tinged red along with his hands, face, legs, and fingers. His eyebrows are thick and expressive, and his moon-like face is framed by soft blue-black waves of hair. His teeth are flawless, and his neck is shaped like a conch. His breath carries a natural fragrance, and his gaze is highly seductive. Kamadeva wears a blue garment and rides a makara, a mythical aquatic creature. He is armed with a sugarcane bow, stringed with a thread of buzzing bees, and five arrows tipped with flowers, each one capable of inducing a specific mood or emotion linked to desire. He holds arrows which are traditionally made from the ashoka blossom, mango flower, jasmine, blue lotus, and white lotus, and are essential components of his iconography. His presence is always associated with śṛṅgāra rasa, the aesthetic mood of romantic and erotic love.

In classical Indian iconography, Kamadeva is portrayed as a youthful and handsome deity, often accompanied by his consort Rati. Surrounding him are various figures and symbols that underscore his association with desire and fertility. Apsaras (celestial nymphs) and gandharvas (heavenly musicians), while absent from Kamadeva’s mythological narratives, frequently appear beside him and Rati in visual depictions, such as in the eighth-century sculpture at the Kailasa Cave Temple at Ellora. At his feet typically sits a brightly colored parrot, his vāhana (vehicle), representing playful affection and the connection between love and speech. His standard often features a makara, symbolizing fertility and primal desire. According to T. A. Gopinatha Rao’s study of the Śilpa Śāstras, Kamadeva is sometimes accompanied by Vasanta, the embodiment of spring, described as a pleasing figure adorned with aśoka leaves, pomegranate flower earrings, and a garland of keśava blossoms. Despite this literary association, Vasanta is rarely depicted in visual art, possibly because another handsome male figure might distract from Kamadeva’s central visual appeal. Kamadeva’s standard-bearer is often shown with the face of a horse, likely a reference to the stallion’s virility and association with generative power, as seen in the unusual twelfth-century Halebid temple depiction where Vasanta is omitted but the horse-faced figure remains. The Śilpa Śāstras prescribe that Kamadeva should be adorned with floral garlands and gold ornaments, holding a sugarcane bow in his left hand and flower-tipped arrows in his right, flanked by his consorts—Rati and Priti, a joyful Vasanta, and a horse-faced standard-bearer carrying a banner emblazoned with a makara. Nonetheless, as Rao notes, artistic representations often diverge from these textual norms. Benton observes that sculptors typically depict Kamadeva only with Rati, his horse-faced flag-bearer, gandharvas, and apsaras, omitting Vasanta. Additional symbolic attributes include a cuckoo, humming bees, the season of spring, celestial nymphs and the gentle breeze.

Though images of standalone Kamadeva are relatively rare, several notable depictions exist. A set of vividly painted, six-foot-tall wooden statues at the Salar Jung Museum in Hyderabad portrays Kamadeva and Rati with dynamic energy and lifelike expressiveness. Other exceptional examples include a sixth-century sculpture from Bijapur and a similarly posed stone sculpture in the Metropolitan Museum of Art, where Kamadeva and Rati are in a tender embrace beneath a canopy of leaves—likely symbolizing a flowering tree or sugarcane plant. A terracotta murti of Kamadeva of great antiquity is housed in the Mathura Museum, UP, India. Literary works like Harṣacarita and Naiṣadhacarita mention inner chambers adorned with paintings or figurines of Kamadeva, Rati, and Priti. Though these artworks have long since vanished, they suggest that Kamadeva was once a visible part of elite aesthetic and devotional spaces.

== Beliefs and worship ==
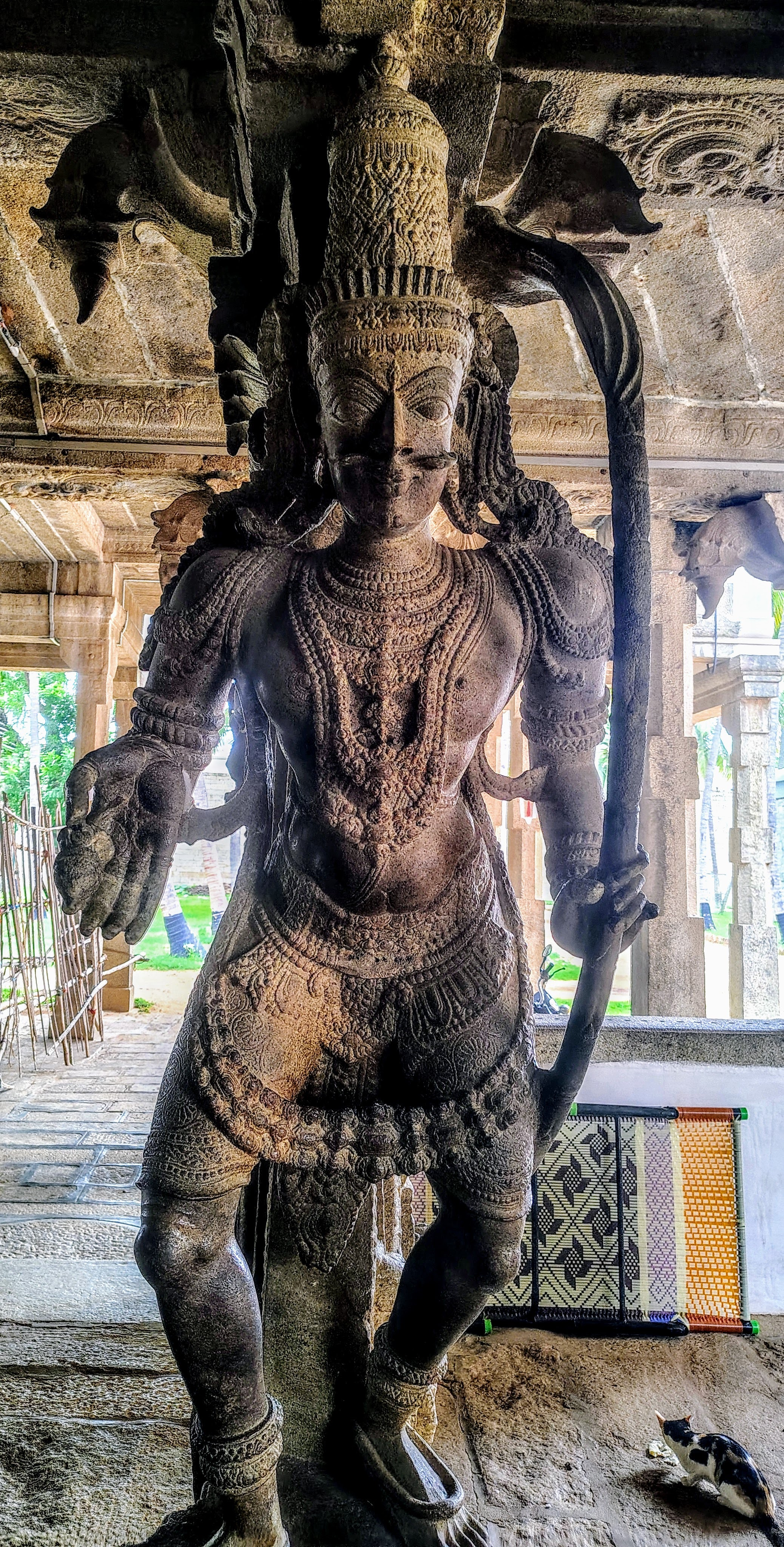
The sculpture of the Hindu God Manmadhan at the Thirukkurungudi Temple, Tamil Nadu.

The deity of Kamadeva along with his consort Rati is included in the pantheon of Vedic-Brahmanical deities such as Shiva and Parvati. In Hindu traditions for the marriage ceremony itself, the bride's feet are often painted with pictures of Suka, the parrot vahana of Kamadeva.

The religious rituals addressed to him offer a means of purification and re-entry into the community. Devotion to Kamadeva keeps desire within the framework of the religious tradition. Kamadeva appears in many stories and becomes the object of devotional rituals for those seeking health, and physical beauty, husbands, wives, and sons. In one story Kamadeva himself succumbs to desire, and must then worship his lover to be released from this passion and its curse.

=== Rituals and festivals ===
Holi is a Hindu festival, celebrated in the Indian subcontinent. It is sometimes called Madana-Mahotsava or Kama-Mahotsava. This festival is mentioned by Jaimini, in his early writings such as Purvamimamsa-sutra, dated c. 400 BC.

The Ashoka tree is often planted near temples. The tree is said to be a symbol of love and is dedicated to Kamadeva.

=== In Gaudiya Vaishnavism ===
In the Gaudiya Vaishnava tradition, Krishna is identified as the original Kamadeva in Vrindavana. Kamadeva also incarnates as Krishna's son Shamba after being burned down by Shiva. Since he was begotten by Krishna himself, his qualities were similar to those of Krishna, such as his colour, appearance, and attributes. This Shamba is not considered identical to Vishnu's vyuha-manifestation called Shamba, but is an individual soul (jiva-tattva) who, owing to his celestial powers, becomes an emanation of Vishnu's prowess.

The Kamadeva that was incinerated is believed to be a celestial demigod capable of inducing love and lusty desires. He is distinguished from the spiritual Kamadeva. Here Krishna is the source of Kamadeva's inciting power, the ever-fresh transcendental god of love of Vrindavana, the origin of all forms of Kamadeva, yet above mundane love, who is worshiped with the Kama-Gayatri and Kama-Bija mantras.

When Kamadeva is referenced as smara in Bhāgavata Purāṇa (book 10) in the context of the supramundane love between Krishna and the gopis (cowherd maidens), he is not the Deva who incites lusty feelings. The word smara rather refers to Krishna himself, who through the medium of his flute increases his influence on the devoted gopis. The symptoms of this smarodayam (lit. "arousal of desire") experienced by the gopis have been described in a commentary (by Vishvanatha Cakravarti) as follows: "First comes attraction expressed through the eyes, then intense attachment in the mind, then determination, loss of sleep, becoming emaciated, uninterested in external things, shamelessness, madness, becoming stunned, and death. These are the ten stages of Cupid's effects." The beauty of Krishna's consort, Radha, is without equality in the universe, and her power constantly defeats the god of love, Kamadeva.

=== In Indonesia ===
Kamadeva is also mentioned in the 12th-century Javanese poem Smaradahana, a rendering of the myth of Kamadeva's burning by Shiva and fall from heaven to earth. Kama and his consort Rati are referenced as Kamajaya and Kamarati in Kakawin poetry and later Wayang narratives.

== Temples ==
While it is believed that there are no temples to Kamadeva, and no murtis (statues) of Kamadeva are sold for worship on the market, he frequently appears in illustrations, especially in Shiva temples in South India describing his incineration.

Some other temples dedicated or related to this deva:

- Kameshwara Temple, in Aragalur. The Sthala purana indicates that Kamadeva woke up Shiva at this place.
- Kameshvara Temple, in Kamyavan, is one of the twelve forests of Vrindavana.
- Soundaraja Perumal Temple at Thadikombu, near Dindigul, Tamil Nadu
- Harsat-Mata Temple at Abhaneri has a representation of Kamadeva.

== In Jainism ==
In Jain universal history, Kamadeva does not refer to a single god. Rather, it is a title applied to twenty-four exceptionally handsome and illustrious men in the present descending half-cycle of time (avasarpiṇī). Jain sources distinguish these Kamadevas from the 63 salakapurusas, although three of them—Shantinatha, Kunthunatha, and Aranatha—are also counted among the 24 Tirthankaras. Jain literature, Tiloya Panatti, states that all Kamadevas become ascetics during their lifetime and attain moksha either in the same birth or within the next one or two births.

The 24 Kāmadevas of the current avasarpiṇī are:

1. Bahubali – son of the 1st Tirthankara Ādinātha; famed for renunciation after conquering Bharata.
2. Prajāpati – counted in Jain universal-history lists as an early Kāmadeva of this era.
3. Śrīdhara – remembered in Kāmadeva lists as one of the exceptionally beautiful heroic men of early Jain universal history.
4. Darśanabhadra
5. Prasenacandra
6. Candravarṇa
7. Agniyukta
8. Sanatkumāra – The famous 4th Chakravartin of the present avasarpiṇī and also the 8th Kamadeva
9. Vatsarāja
10. Kanakaprabha
11. Meghaprabha
12. Śāntinātha – 16th Tirthankara; also counted among the Kāmadevas.
13. Kunthunātha – 17th Tirthankara; also counted among the Kāmadevas.
14. Aranātha – 18th Tirthankara; also counted among the Kāmadevas.
15. Vijayarāja
16. Śrīcandra
17. Nalarāja – generally identified with the famous King Nala of Jain retellings.
18. Hanumān – the Jain Hanumān of the Rāmāyaṇa tradition; counted among the Kāmadevas though not among the 63 śalākāpuruṣas.
19. Balirāja – identified with the celebrated king Bali in Jain universal-history tradition.
20. Vasudeva – listed as a Kāmadeva; not to be confused with the class of the nine Vāsudevas.
21. Pradyumna – son of Krishna in Jain retellings of the Harivaṃśa cycle.
22. Nāgakumāra – hero of the Jain Nāgakumāra Carita tradition.
23. Jīvandhara – celebrated hero of the Jīvandhara Carita cycle in later Jain literature.
24. Jambūsvāmī – the last Kevali (omniscient) disciple in Jain tradition, revered in both sectarian traditions.

== In English literature ==
Letitia Elizabeth Landon's descriptive poem Manmadin, the Indian Cupid, floating down the Ganges appeared in The Literary Gazette, 1822 (Fragment in Rhyme VII.)
