= Preet =

Preet may refer to:

- Preet Bharara (born 1968), Indian-American lawyer, author, and former federal prosecutor who served as the United States Attorney for the Southern District of New York from 2009 to 2017
- Preet Brar, Indian musician
- Preet Gill (born 1972), British-Indian Labour Co-op politician, MP for Birmingham Edgbaston since 2017
- Preet Kaur Nayak, Indian television actress
- Preet Vihar, subdistrict of Delhi, India
  - Preet Vihar metro station

== See also ==
- Preeti (disambiguation)
