= Chakravarti (Sanskrit term) =

Ancient Indian term

Chinese name
- Traditional Chinese: 轉輪王
- Literal meaning: Wheel-Turning King
Transcriptions
Standard Mandarin
- Hanyu Pinyin: Zhuǎnlúnwáng

Alternative Chinese name
- Traditional Chinese: 轉輪聖王
- Literal meaning: Wheel-Turning Sacred King
Transcriptions
Standard Mandarin
- Hanyu Pinyin: Zhuǎnlún Shèngwáng

Vietnamese name
- Vietnamese: Chuyển Luân Vương or Chuyển Luân Thánh Vương
- Hán-Nôm: 転輪王 or 転輪聖王

Korean name
- Hangul: 전륜성왕
- Hanja: 轉輪聖王
Transcriptions
- Revised Romanization: Jeonryunseongwang

Japanese name
- Kanji: 転輪王 or 転輪聖王
Transcriptions
- Romanization: Tenrin'ō or Tenrinjōō

Sanskrit name
- Sanskrit: चक्रवर्तिन् cakravartin

Pali name
- Pali: cakkavatti

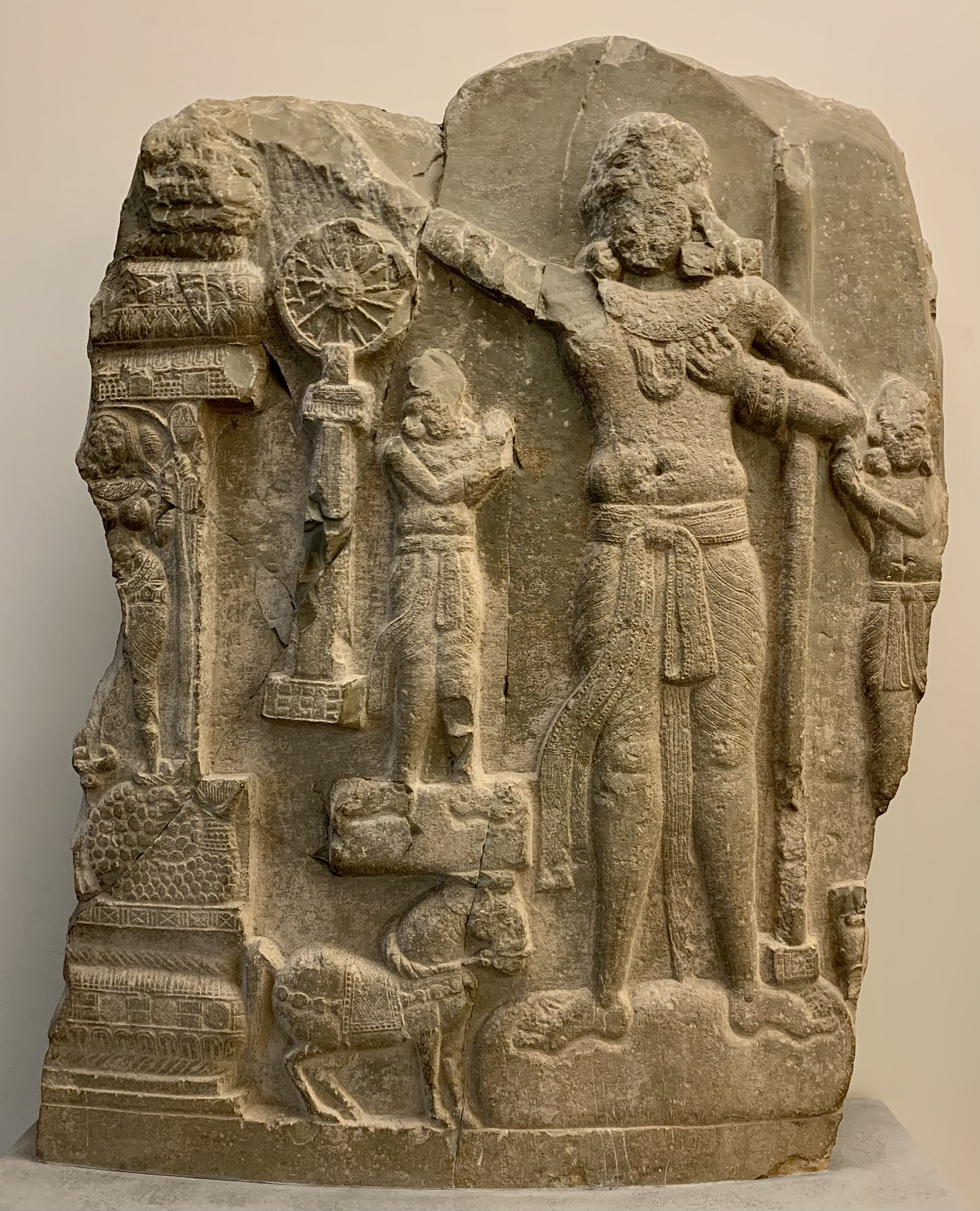
Chakravarti, from Amaravati Stupa, 1st century CE, using the "Imperial Gesture" and surrounded by his attributes, represents Ashoka of the Mauryan Empire.

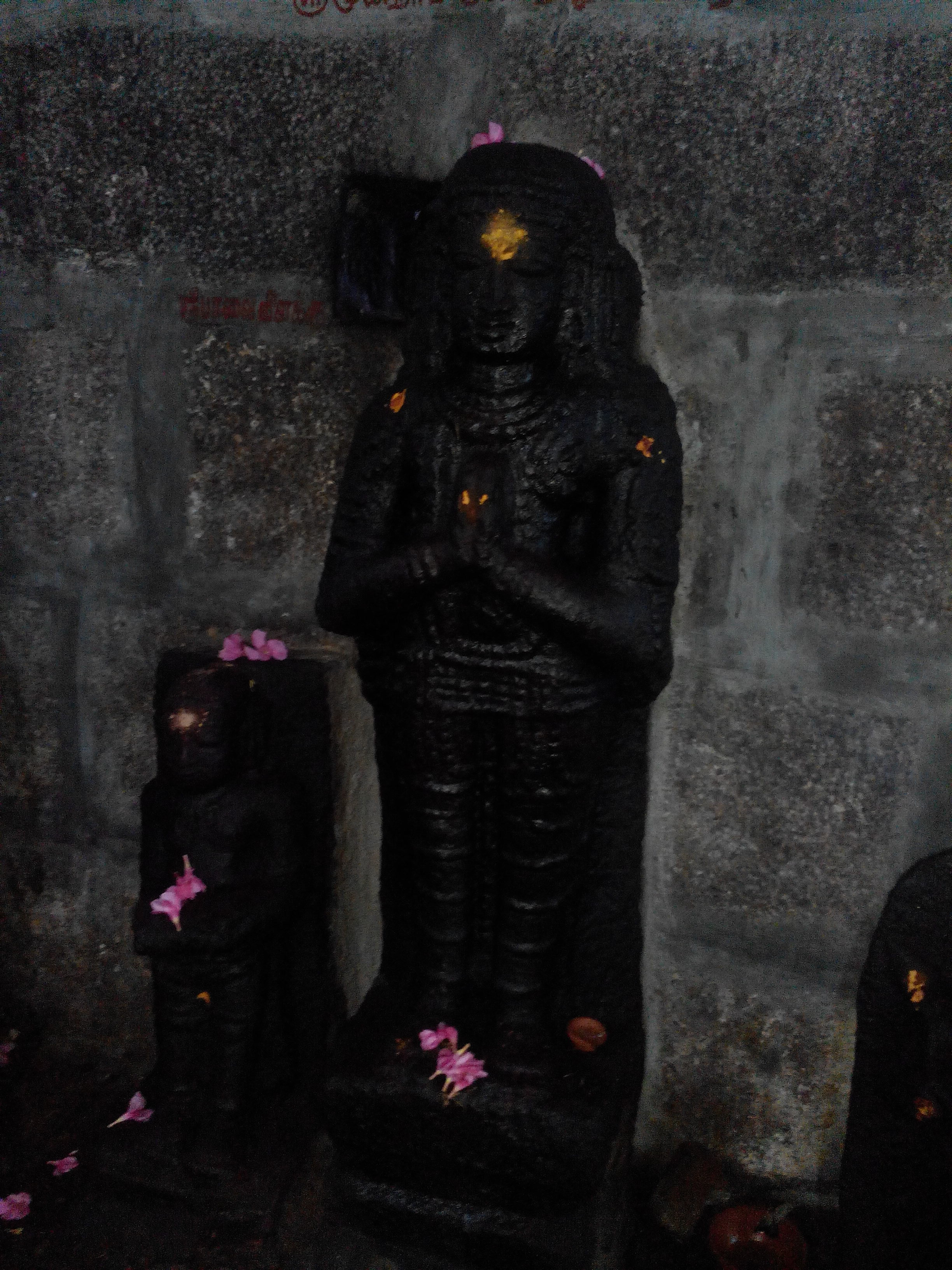
Chola ruler Kulothunga III was addressed as Chakravarti.

A chakravarti (Sanskrit: चक्रवर्तिन्, IAST: Cakravartin) is an ideal (or idealized) universal ruler in the historiography and religion of India. The concept is present in Indian subcontinent cultural traditions, narrative myths, and lore. There are three types of chakravarti: chakravala chakravarti, an emperor who rules over all four of the continents (i.e., a universal monarch); dvipa chakravarti, a ruler who governs only one of those continents; and pradesha chakravarti, a monarch who leads the people of only a part of a continent, the equivalent of a local king. Dvipa chakravarti is particularly one who rules the entire Indian subcontinent (as in the case of the Mauryan Empire). The concept of Chakravartin may have developed by the time of the early Maurya kings, in the 4th to 3rd century BCE, such as Emperor Ashoka, and it is mentioned in the Arthashastra (formerly considered to be a Maurya-period text but now re-dated as later).

The word cakra-vartin- is a bahuvrīhi compound word, translating to "one who moves the wheels", in the sense of "whose chariot is rolling everywhere without obstruction". It can also be analysed as an instrumental tatpuruṣa: "through whom the wheel is moving" in the meaning of "through whom the Dharmachakra ('Wheel of the Dharma') is turning" (most commonly used in Buddhism). The Tibetan equivalent ཁོར་ལོས་སྒྱུར་བའི་རྒྱལ་པོ་ (khor los sgyur ba'i rgyal po) translates to "monarch who controls by means of a wheel".

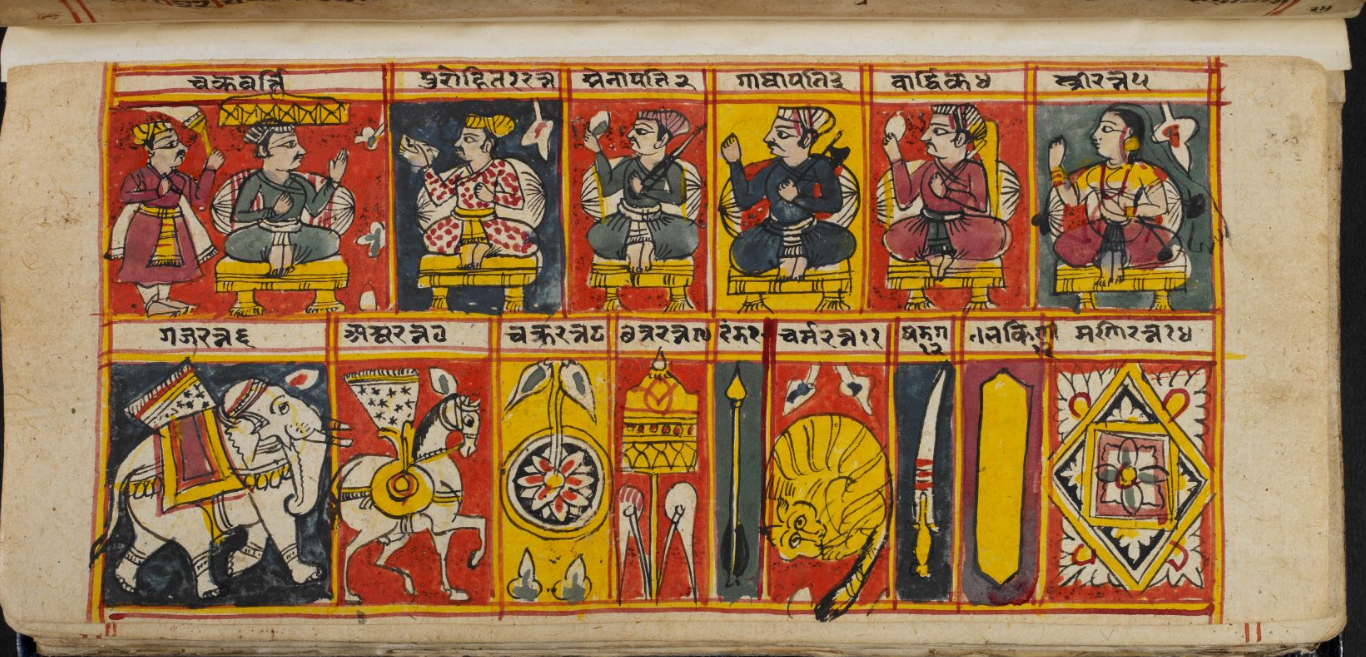
14 Ratna (jewels) of Chankravartin. Miniature from the 17th century, Saṁgrahaṇīratna by Śrīcandra, in Prakrit with a Gujarati commentary. Jain Śvetāmbara cosmological text with commentary and illustrations.

In Buddhism, a chakravarti is the secular counterpart of a buddha. The term applies to temporal as well as spiritual emperorship and leadership, particularly in Buddhism and Jainism. In Hinduism, a chakravarti is a powerful ruler whose dominion extends to the entire earth. In both religions, the chakravarti is supposed to uphold dharma, indeed being "he who turns the wheel (of dharma)".

The Indian concept of chakravarti later evolved into the concept of devaraja – the divinity of kings – which was adopted by the Indianised Hindu-Buddhist kingdoms of Southeast Asia through Hindu Brahmin scholars deployed from India to their courts. It was first adopted by Javanese Hindu-Buddhist empires such as Majapahit; through them by the Khmer Empire; and subsequently by the Thai monarchs.

== Historical usage ==
The following are the monarchs who used or were associated with the title of Chakarvarti:

=== South Asia ===
- Ashoka, Emperor of the Maurya Empire.
- Samprati, Emperor of the Maurya Empire.
- Kanishka, Emperor of the Kushan Empire.
- Samudragupta, Emperor of the Gupta Empire.
- Chandragupta II, Emperor of the Gutpa Empire.
- Skandagupta, Emperor of the Gupta Empire.
- Kulothunga III, Emperor of the Chola Empire.
- Vikramaditya VI, Emperor of the Western Chalukya Empire.

== Hinduism ==
According to the traditions "Vishnu, in the form of Chakra, was held as the ideal of worship for Kings desirous of obtaining Universal Sovereignty", a concept associated with the Bhagavata Puranas, a religious sanction traceable to the Gupta period, which also led to the chakravartin concept. There are relatively few examples of chakravartins in both northern and southern India.

Bharata, the son of Dushyanta and Shakuntala, was conferred the title of cakravartin samrāj, according to some legends. Another emperor of the same name, who was the son of Rishabha, was also given the title cakravartin.

In Southern India, the Pallava period beginning with Simhavishnu (575–900 CE) was a transitional stage in southern Indian society with monument building, establishment of Bhakti sects of Alvars and Nayanars, flowering of rural Brahmanical institutions of Sanskrit learning, and the establishment of Chakravartin model of emperorship over a territory of diverse people; which ended the pre-Pallavan era of territorially segmented people, each with their culture, under a tribal chieftain. The Pallava period extolled ranked relationships based on ritual purity as enjoined by the shastras. Burton distinguishes between the Chakravatin model and the Kshatriya model, and likens kshatriyas to locally based warriors with ritual status sufficiently high enough to share with Brahmins; and states that in south India the kshatriya model did not emerge. As per Burton, South India was aware of the Indo-Aryan Varna organized society in which decisive secular authority was vested in the Kshatriyas; but apart from the Pallava, Chola and Vijayanagar line of warriors which claimed Chakravartin status, only few locality warrior families achieved the prestigious kin-linked organization of northern warrior groups.

== Jainism ==
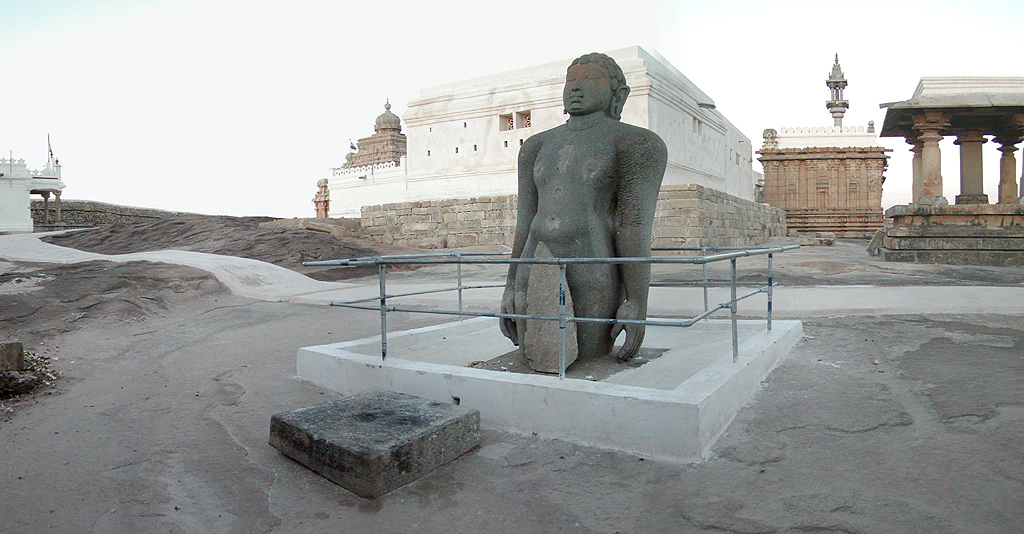
Statue of Bharata Chakravartin at Shravanabelagola

During the each motion of the half-cycle of the wheel of time, 63 Salakapurusa or 63 illustrious men, consisting of the 12 Chakravartin regularly appear. The Jain cosmology or legendary history is basically a compilation of the deeds of these illustrious men. As per Jain cosmology, Chakravartins are Universal Monarchs or World Conquerors. Golden in complexion, they all belonged to the Ikshvaku Vamsha and Kasyapa gotra. The mother of a Chakravartin sees some dreams at the time of conception. A chakravartin is considered an ideal human being endowed with thirty-two major signs of excellence and many minor signs of excellence.

The list of 12 chakravartin of Avasarpini as per Jainism is as follows

1. Bharata, son of Tirthankara Rishabhanatha
2. Sagara, ancestor of Bhagiratha as in the Puranas
3. Maghava
4. Sanata Kumara
5. Tirthankara Shantinatha
6. Tirthankara Kunthunatha
7. Tirthankara Aranatha
8. Subhauma
9. Padmanabha
10. Harishena
11. Jayasena
12. Brahmadatta

Some of these Cakravartins are also Tirthankaras: Śāntinātha, Kunthunātha and Aranātha. Jain universal-history texts describe the Cakravartin as a universal emperor who rules the six divisions of Bhārata-varṣa, possesses fourteen ratnas and nine nidhis, and may have different spiritual destinies at the end of life.

=== Notes on selected Jain Chakravartins ===
Harisena is named in Jain universal history as the tenth of the twelve Cakravartins of the present avasarpiṇī. In Jain tradition, Gunabhadra's Uttarapurana places him in the tīrtha of Munisuvratanatha and describes his acquisition of the Cakravartin jewels and treasures, his digvijaya (six parts of Baharat-Shetra), and his later renunciation after seeing a lunar eclipse, which served as a reminder of the transience of worldly glory. He gave the kingdom to his son Mahasena, accepted ascetic discipline under the monk Srinaga. After a life of rigorous penance, he was reborn in Sarvarthasiddhi, the highest of the five Anuttara heavens in Jain cosmology.

=== The 14 Ratnas of a Chakravartin ===
In Jainism, a Chakravartin Samrat is characterized by his possession of 14 ratnas (jewels), which serve as symbols of his universal sovereignty. The concept of these 14 attributes is rooted in the Upāṅga Āgamas, the secondary canon of Jainism traditionally dated to the 4th century BCE. These jewels were later systematically described and codified in the 12th-century cosmological text Bṛhat-saṁgrahaṇī (also known as the Sangrahani Ratna), written by the Jain monk Chandrasuri c. 1114 CE.

The 14 jewels are divided into two categories: seven inanimate (one-sensed) objects and seven animate (five-sensed) beings.

==== Seven Inanimate Jewels (Eka-indriya) ====
- Chakra-ratna: A miraculous diamond-serrated discus that never misses its target; it precedes the monarch’s army during his world-conquering expedition (digvijaya).
- Chhatra-ratna: A divine imperial umbrella that symbolizes universal protection and sovereignty.
- Asi-ratna: A divine, invincible sword representing the monarch's military power.
- Danda-ratna: A magic staff used to level uneven ground and clear paths through forests or obstacles.
- Mani-ratna: A divine wish-fulfilling jewel that emits immense light, capable of dispelling darkness for miles.
- Kakini-ratna: A divine jewel or cowrie that produces immense wealth and is used by the monarch to mark his boundaries.
- Charma-ratna: A miraculous skin or shield that can expand to cover a huge army or serve as a bridge over water.

==== Seven Animate Jewels (Pancha-indriya) ====
- Stri-ratna: The Empress (Queen consort), who embodies ideal beauty, virtue, and wisdom.
- Gaja-ratna: A divine celestial elephant, representing the vanguard of the monarch's huge army of elephants.
- Ashva-ratna: A divine horse of great speed, representing the monarch's huge army of cavalry.
- Vardhaki-ratna: A master architect or carpenter capable of building cities, palaces, and tunnels instantaneously.
- Senapati-ratna: A supreme general who commands the huge army and war-chariots.
- Grihapati-ratna: A master of the household or treasurer who manages the Emperor's vast wealth and granaries.
- Purohita-ratna: A high priest or spiritual advisor who guides the monarch in administrative and religious matters.

== Buddhism ==
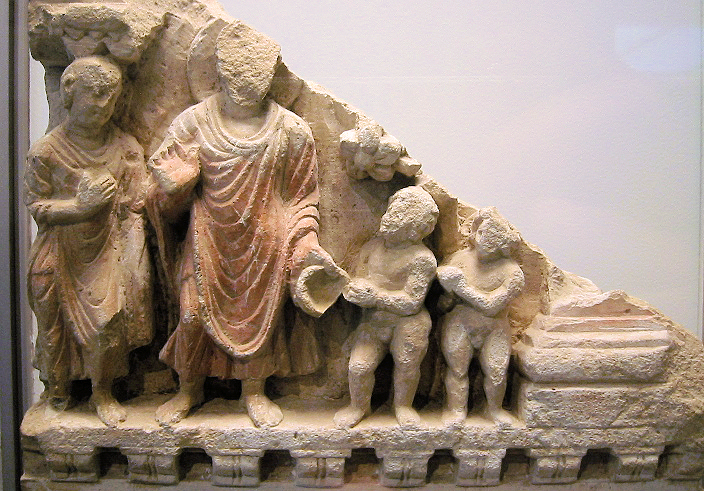
A 2nd century CE Gandhara art depicting "the gift of dirt" story

In Buddhist chronicles, Buddha supposedly told the boy Jaya that he would indeed become an Chakravarti emperor in next life as a result of his act of generosity in offering sand and the boy in next life born as Ashoka.

It was believed that once a chakravarti emerged the "Future Buddha" Maitreya would appear on earth.

In early Buddhist art there are more than 30 depictions, all from the Deccan. In most the Chakravarti Emperor uses the "Imperial Gesture" in which the emperor "clenches his left hand at his chest and reaches up with his right hand". He is surrounded by his seven attributes: the Chakraratna wheel, his state elephant, charger horse, "the octagonal gem which is so luminous it can light the path of his army by night", his empress, defense minister and finance minister.

The early Buddhist Mahāvastu (1.259f) and the Divyāvadāna, as well as the Theravadin Milindapañha, describe the marks of the chakravarti as ruler: uṣṇīṣa, chhatra "parasol", "horn jewel" or vajra, whisk and sandals. These were the marks of the kshatriya. Plastic art of early Mahayana Buddhism illustrates bodhisattvas in a form called uṣṇīṣin "wearing a turban/hair binding", wielding the mudras for "nonviolent cakravarti rule".

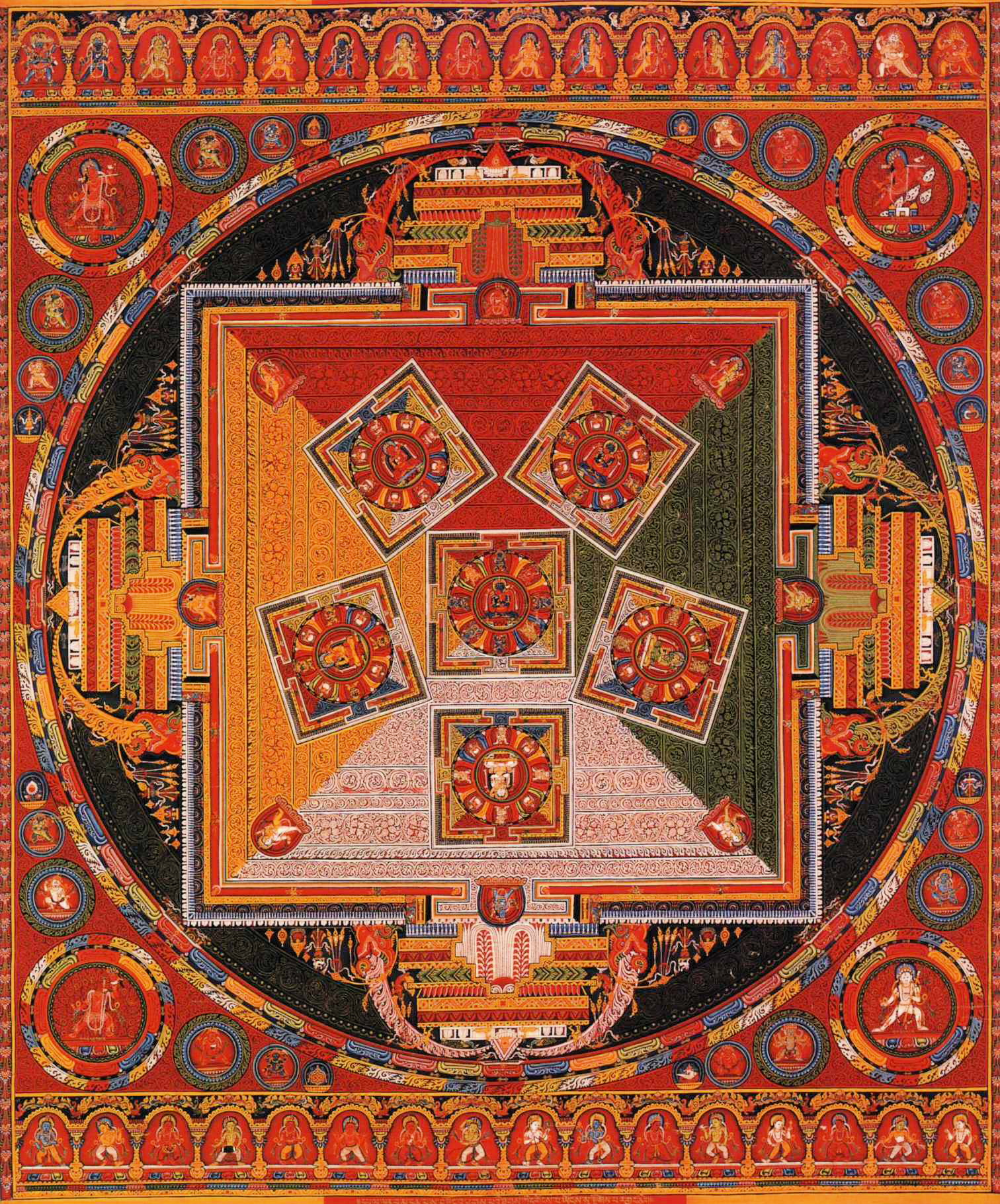
Tibetan mandala of the six chakravartis

== See also ==
=== Similar Indic concepts ===
- Chakraborty
- Chhatrapati
- Devaraja
- Kalachakra
- Maharaja
- Rajamandala
- Samrat

=== Generic similar concepts ===
- Philosopher king
- Solar chariot
- Universal monarchy
- King of the Universe

=== Spread and evolution of Chakravarti concept beyond India ===
- Greater India
- Kingdoms of Southeast Asia
- Indianisation
