= Kamagita =

Kamagita is a Hindu text found in the Mahabharata, Book 14: Ashwamedha parva, Chapter/Section 13 Slok/Verse 12-17. It is one of the many Gita's found in Mahabharata, a Hindu epic, most popular among them being Bhagavad Gita. Kamagita is 5 verses long. Krishna recites Kamagita to Udhisthir when he tells him about the importance of suppression of desire. It sings praise of Kama and tells how every action to suppress desire without suitable means is useless.
