= Kunthunatha =

17th Tirthankara in Jainism in current cycle of Jain cosmology

- 17th Tirthankara, 6th Chakravarti, and 12th Kamadeva
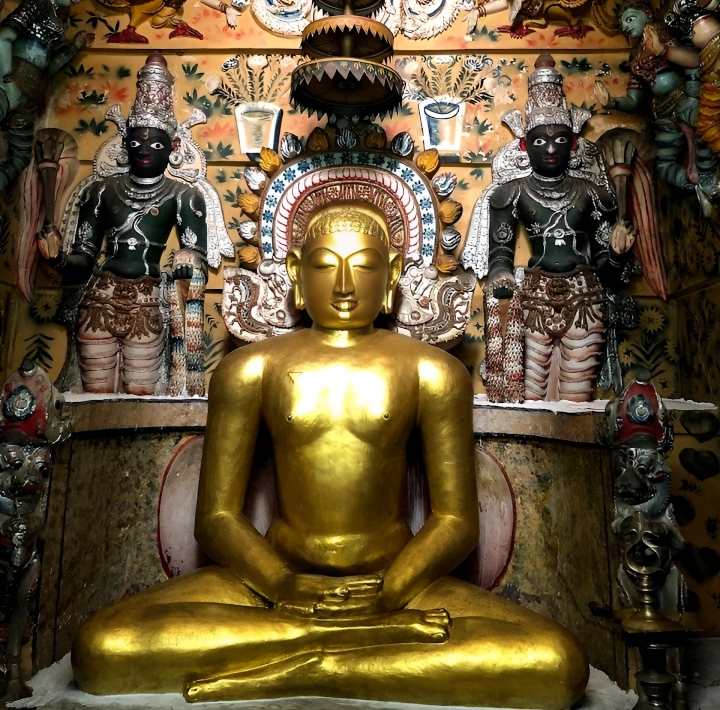
- The idol of Kunthunatha at Karanthai Jain temple
- Venerated in: Jainism
- Predecessor: Shantinatha
- Successor: Aranatha
- Symbol: Goat
- Height: 35 bows (105 metres)
- Age: over 95,000 years
- Color: Golden

Genealogy
- Born: Hastinapur
- Died: Sammed Shikhar
- Parents: Śurya (father); Śrīdevī (mother)
- Dynasty: Kuruvaṁśa—Ikṣvākuvaṁśa

Kunthunath was the seventeenth Tirthankara, sixth Chakravartin and twelfth Kamadeva of the present half time cycle, Avasarpini. According to Jain beliefs, he became a siddha, liberated soul which has destroyed all of its karma. Kunthunatha was born to King Surya (Sura) and Queen Shridevi at Hastinapur in the Ikshvaku dynasty on the fourteenth day of the Vaishakh Krishna month of the Indian calendar.

== Etymology ==
Kunthu means heap of Jewels.

== Life ==
According to the Jain belief, he was born in 27,695,000 BC. His height is mentioned as 35 dhanusha. Like all other Chakravartin, he also conquered all the lands and went to write his name on the foothills of mountains. Seeing the names of other Chakravartin already there, he saw his ambitions dwarfed. He then renounced his throne and became an ascetic for penance. At an age of 95,000 years he liberated his soul and attained Moksha on Mount Shikharji.

Kunthanatha is said to have been born 1/2 palya after his predecessor, Shantinatha. His successor, Aranatha, is said to have been born 1/4 palya less 6,000 crore years after him.

== Iconography ==
Kunthunatha is conventionally depicted in a sitting or standing meditative posture. The distinguishing emblem of this tirthankara is a goat, which allows worshippers to identify his idols. In traditional Jain descriptions, Kunthunatha is associated with a golden physical complexion.

=== Ancient idols and artifacts ===
The 17th tirthankara, Kunthunatha, is a defining figure within the Aluara hoard discovered near Dhanbad, Jharkhand. This 11th-century collection of Digambara bronzes contains rare, identifiable idols of Kunthunatha seated in the padmasana (lotus position). These specific artifacts, currently preserved at the Patna Museum, are highly significant for tracing the regional iconography of the later tirthankaras in eastern India.

== Famous Temple ==
As the 17th tirthankara, Kunthunatha is widely venerated across the Indian subcontinent, resulting in the construction of several significant historical monuments dedicated to his worship.

=== Places of birth and liberation ===
In northern India, the ancient city of Hastinapur is traditionally recognized in Jain universal history as his royal birthplace, making the city's Digamber Jain Mandir Hastinapur a major pilgrimage center for his devotees.

Marking the geographic site of his ultimate spiritual liberation (moksha), a dedicated shrine (tonk) enshrining his footprints is actively venerated by pilgrims on the peaks of Mount Shikharji in modern-day Jharkhand.

=== Other temples ===
In western India, a prominent 15th-century Śvētāmbara temple dedicated specifically to Kunthunatha is located within the UNESCO World Heritage Site of Jaisalmer Fort in Rajasthan, which is highly renowned for its intricate stone carvings.

In southern India, Karanthai Jain temple is major centre dedicated to Kunthunatha. The Ganigitti Jain temple in Hampi, Karnataka, stands as a major 14th-century architectural monument dedicated to him. Constructed in 1385 CE during the Vijayanagara Empire by the military commander Iruguppa, this Dravidian-style temple features a prominent stone inscription explicitly dedicating the primary sanctuary to Kunthunatha.

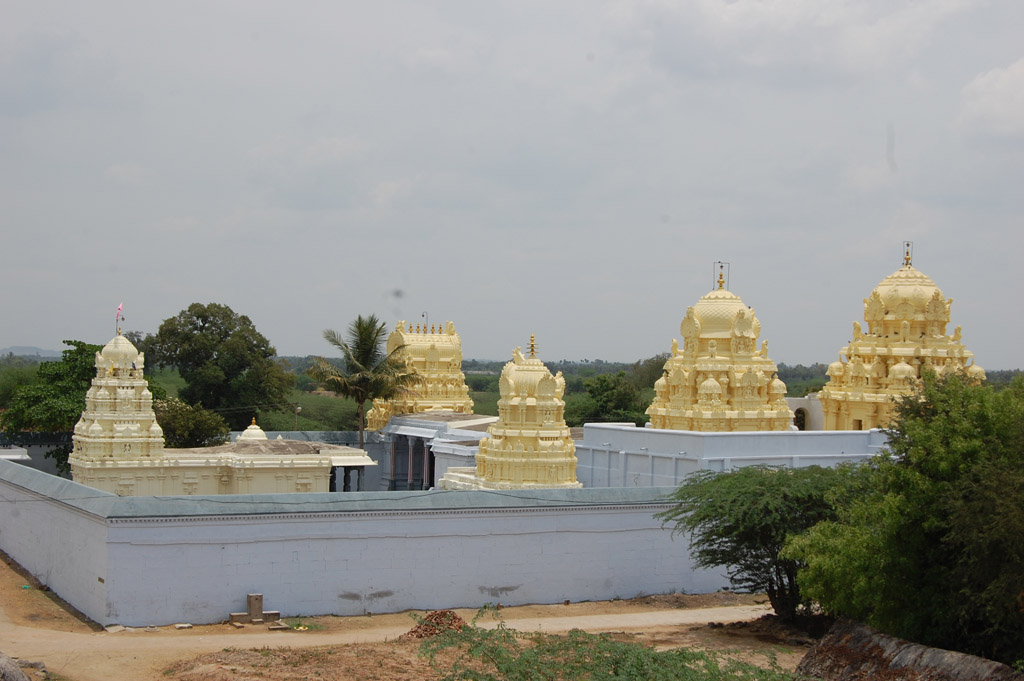
Karanthai Jain temple, 9th century

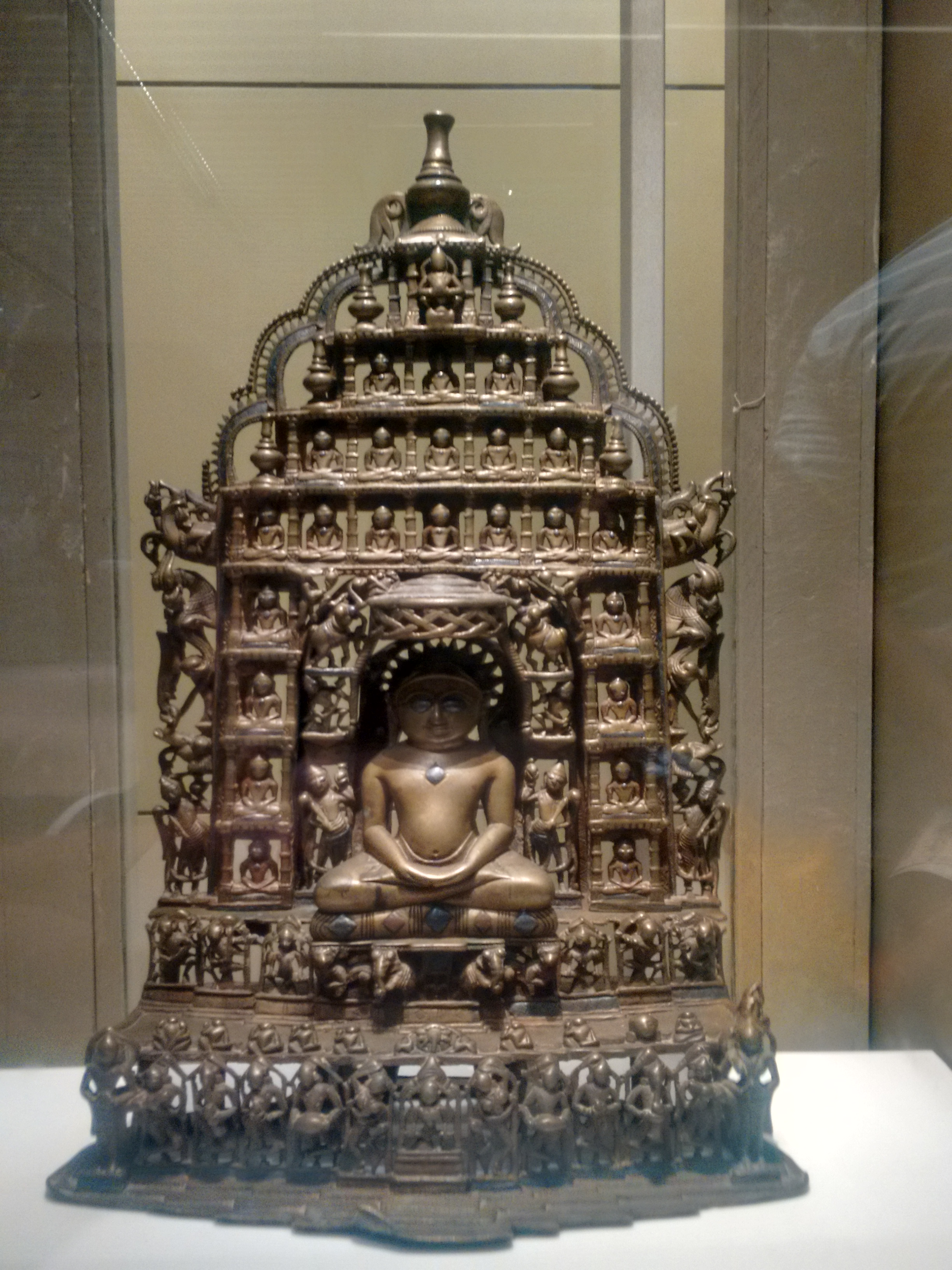
Chaubisi of Kunthunatha, Chaubisi of Kunthunatha at National Museum, New Delhi, 15th century

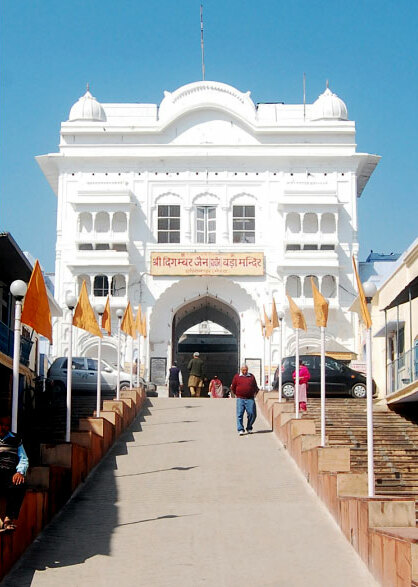
Prachin Bada Mandir, Hastinapur

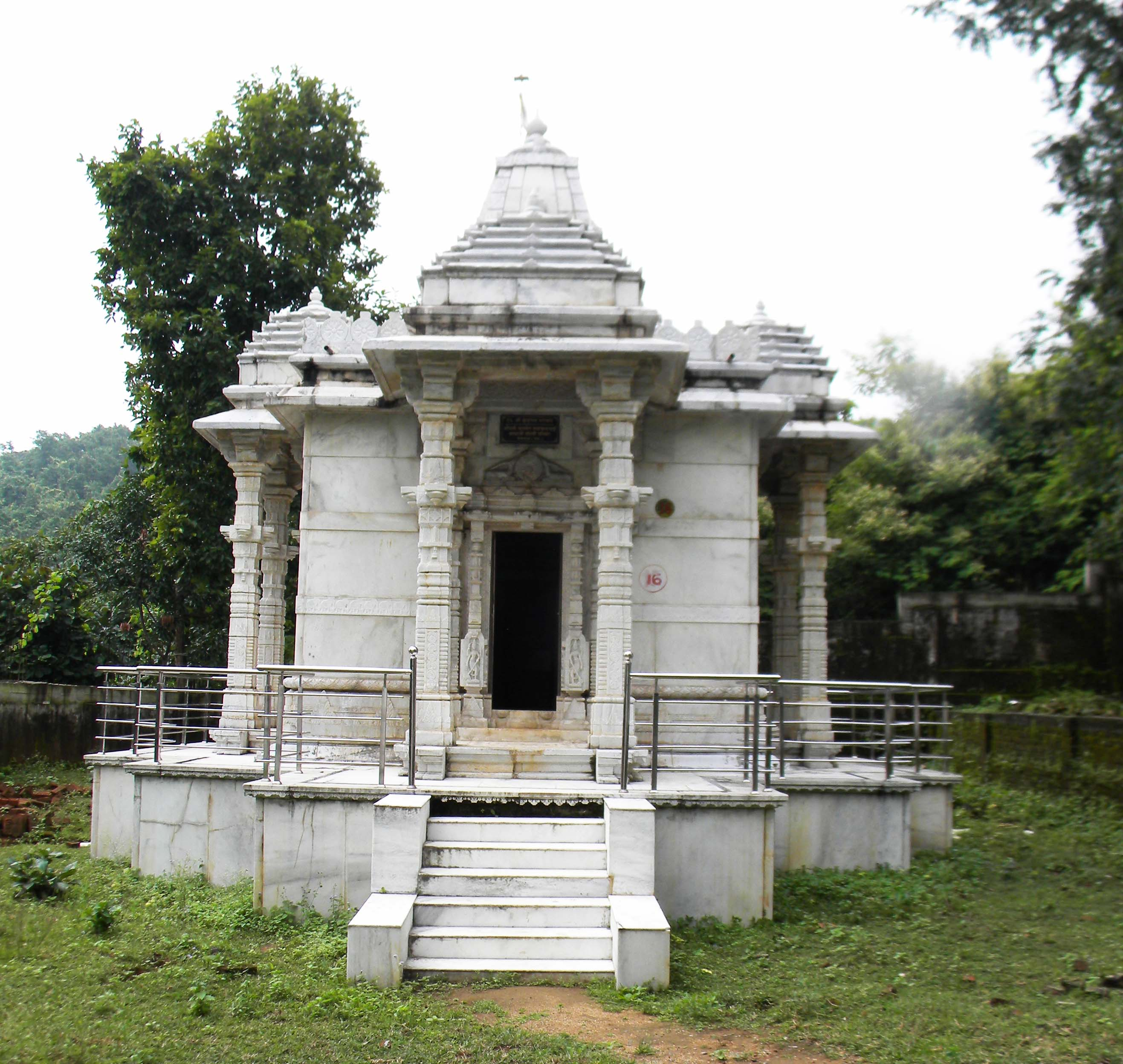
Kunthunath Temple, Madhuban

== See also ==
- God in Jainism
- Arihant (Jainism)
- Jainism and non-creationism
