= Aranatha =

18th Jain Tirthankara

- 18th Tirthankara, 7th Chakravarti, and 13th Kamadeva
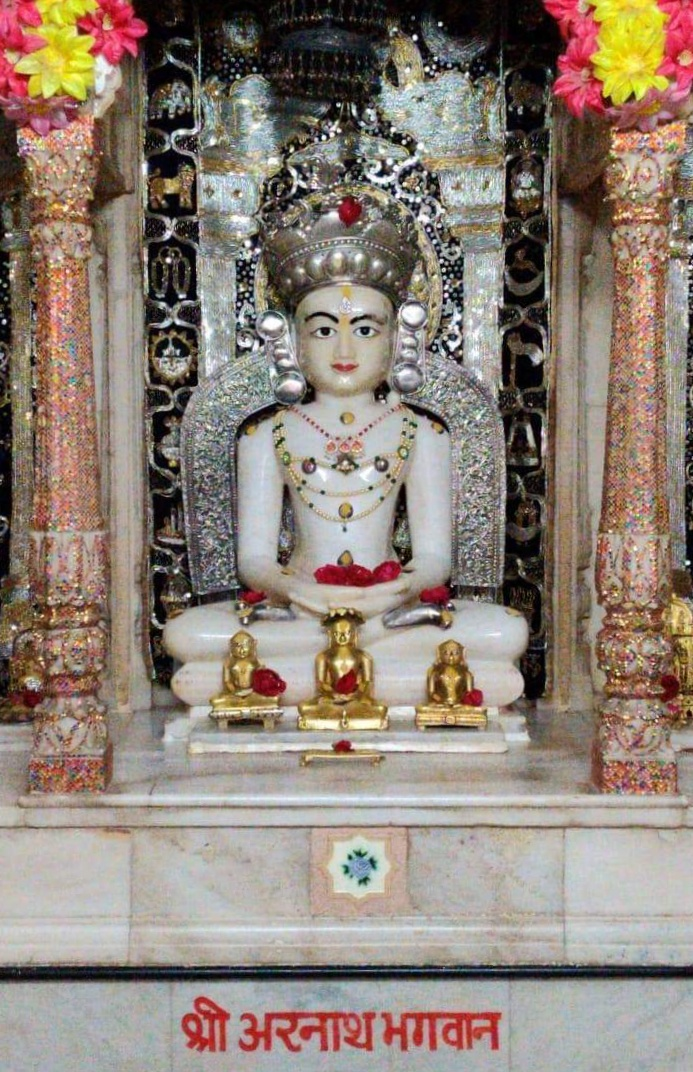
- The idol of Tirthankara Aranatha in a Jinalaya at Amritsar,Punjab
- Venerated in: Jainism
- Predecessor: Kunthunatha
- Successor: Mallinatha
- Symbol: Fish
- Height: 30 bows (90 metres)
- Age: 84,000+
- Color: Golden

Genealogy
- Born: Hastinapur
- Died: Sammed Shikhar
- Parents: Sudarśana (father); Mitrādevī (mother)
- Dynasty: Kuruvaṁśa—Ikṣvākuvaṁśa

Aranath(Arnath) was the eighteenth Jain Tirthankar of the present half cycle of time (Avasarpini). He was also the eighth Chakravartin and thirteenth Kamadeva. According to Jain beliefs, he was born around 16,585,000 BCE. He became a siddha i.e. a liberated soul which has destroyed all of its karmas. Aranath was born to King Sudarshana and Queen Devi (Mitra) at Hastinapur in the Ikshvaku dynasty. His birth date was the tenth day of the Migsar Krishna month of the Indian calendar.

== Life ==
Aranatha's height is mentioned as 30 dhanusha. Like all other Chakravartin, he also conquered all the lands and went to write his name on the foothills of mountains. Seeing the names of other Chakravartin already there, he saw his ambitions dwarfed. He then renounced his throne and became an ascetic for penance. At an age over 84,000 years he and attained Moksha (liberation) on Mount Shikharji.

Aranatha is said to have been born 1/4 palya less 6,000 crore years after his predecessor, Kunthunatha. His successor, Mallinatha, is said to have been born 1,000 crore less 6,584,000 years after him.

== Worship ==
Svayambhūstotra by Acarya Samantabhadra is the adoration of twenty-four tirthankaras. Twenty slokas (aphorisms) of Svayambhūstotra are dedicated to Tirthankar Aranath. One such sloka is:

O Passionless Lord Aranatha! Your physical form which is free from all vestiges of ornaments, clothes and weapons, and the embodiment of unalloyed knowledge, control of the senses, and benevolence, is a clear indication that you have vanquished all blemishes.

— Svayambhustotra (18-2-12)

== As a historical figure ==
At Mathura, there is an old stupa with the inscription of 157 CE. This inscription records that an image of the tīrthankara Aranath was set up at the stupa built by the gods. However, Somadeva Suri stated in Yashstilaka and Jinaprabha Suri in Vividha Tirtha Kalpa that the stupa was erected for Suparśvanātha.

== Iconography ==
Aranatha is conventionally depicted in a sitting or standing meditative posture. The distinguishing emblem of this tirthankara is a fish, which allows worshippers to identify his idols. In traditional Jain descriptions, Aranatha is prominently associated with a golden physical complexion. Furthermore, classical Digambara texts such as the Svayambhūstotra describe his physical representation as being entirely free from all vestiges of ornaments, clothes, and weapons, symbolizing the embodiment of unalloyed knowledge and absolute control of the senses.

== Temples ==
As the 18th tirthankara, Aranatha is venerated across the Indian subcontinent with several historically and regionally significant temple complexes dedicated to him.

=== Places of birth and liberation ===
The ancient city of Hastinapur in Uttar Pradesh, traditionally identified in Jain universal history as his royal birthplace, serves as a primary center for his worship. Within this city, the Digamber Jain Mandir Hastinapur stands as a highly revered Digambara temple complex that prominently features his idols and commemorates his early life and renunciation.

Marking the geographic site of his ultimate spiritual liberation (moksha), a dedicated shrine (tonk) enshrining his footprints (charan) is actively worshipped by pilgrims on the peaks of Mount Shikharji in Jharkhand.

=== Other temples ===
In South India, the renowned late 16th-century Chaturmukha Basadi in Karkala, Karnataka, is heavily associated with his veneration. Completed in 1586 CE, this fully symmetrical stone temple enshrines life-size idols of Aranatha, alongside the tirthankaras Mallinatha and Munisuvrata, facing all four cardinal directions.

In western India, the Navagarh Tirth located in Maharashtra operates as a major regional pilgrimage site dedicated specifically to his worship.

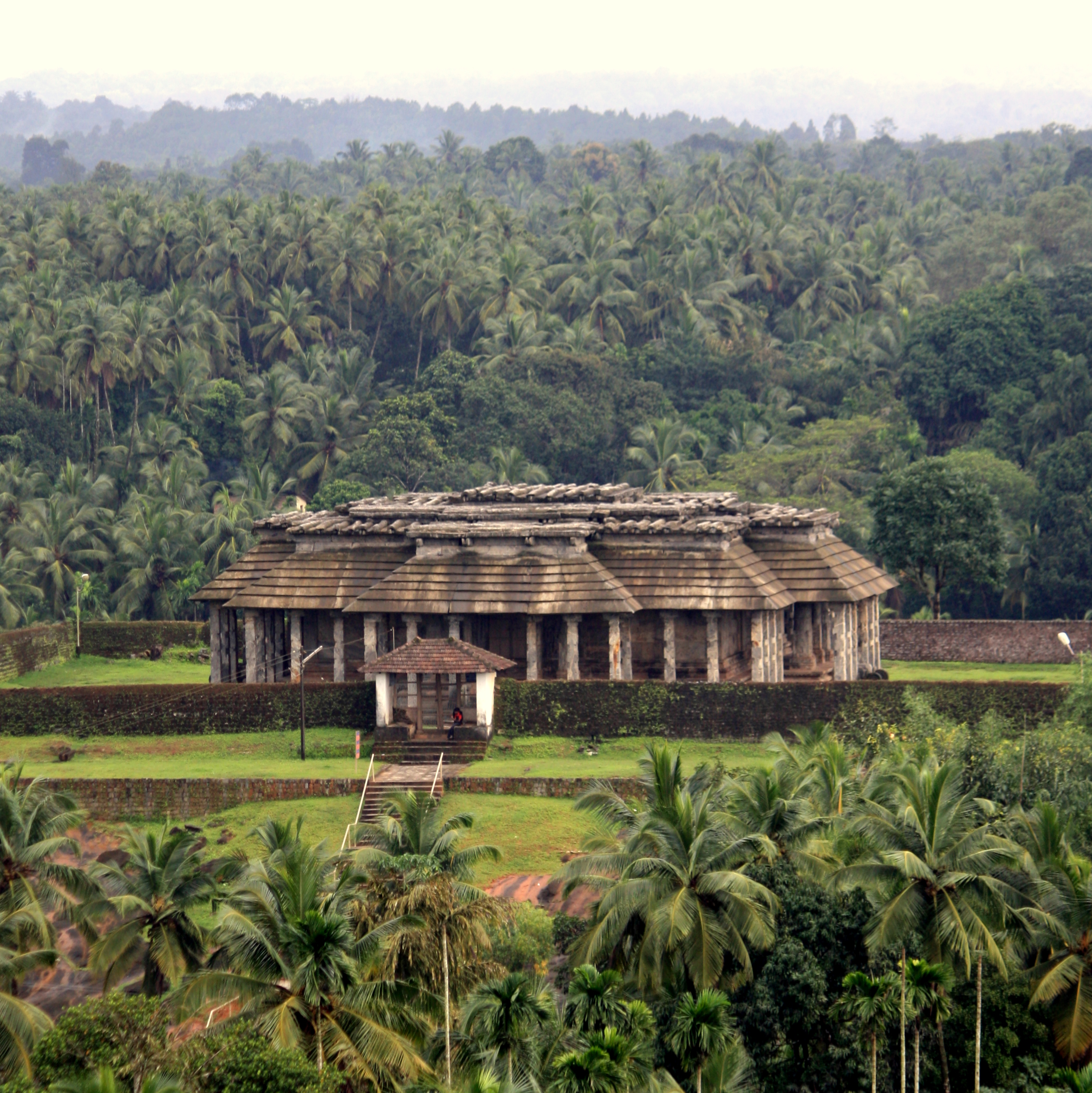
Chaturmukha basadi (Karnataka) dedicated to Tirthankara Aranath

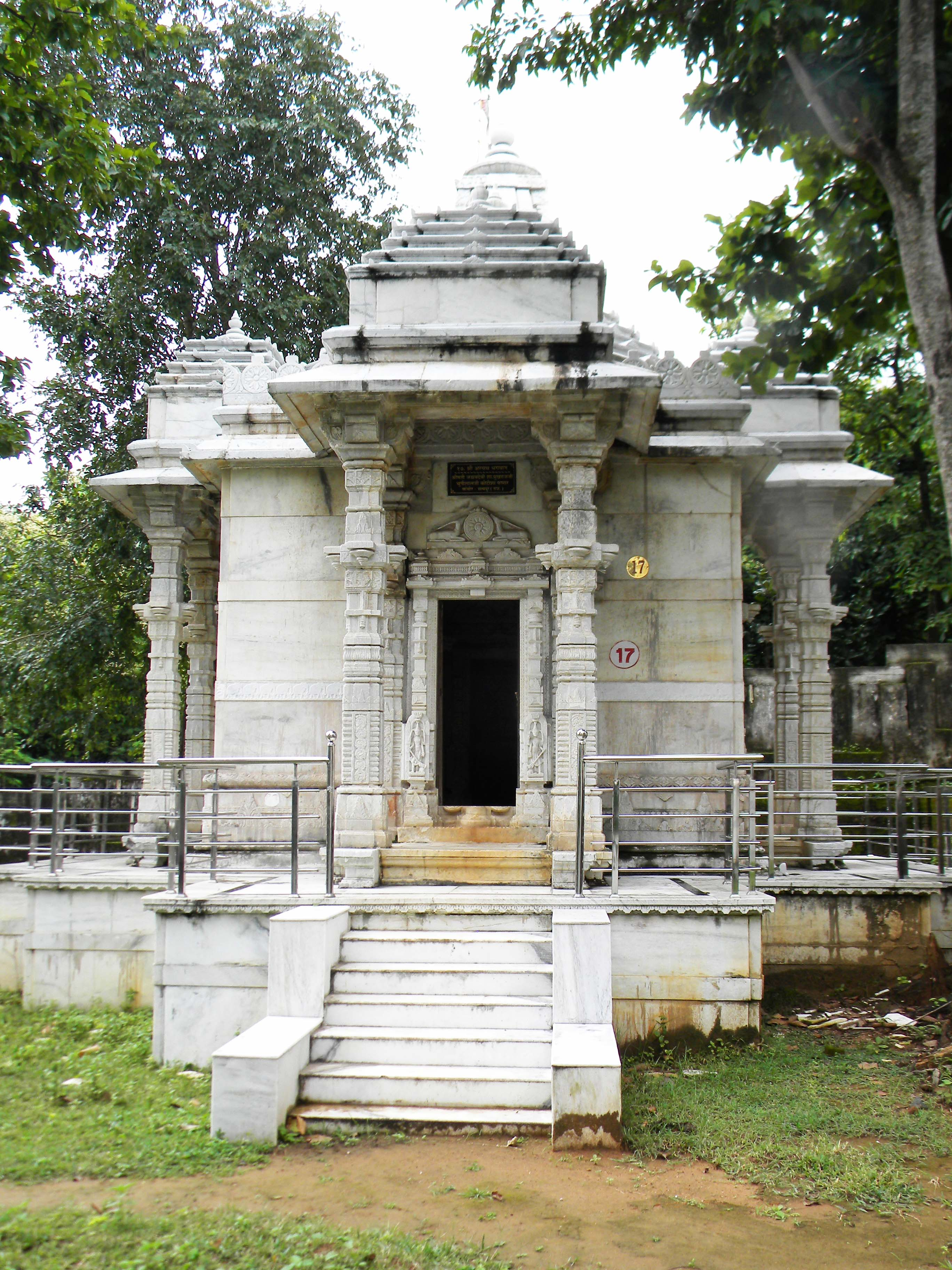
Jain temple dedicated to Tirthankar Aranath

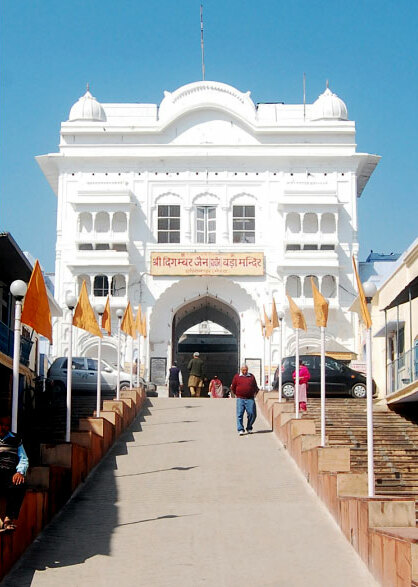
Prachin Bada Mandir, Hastinapur

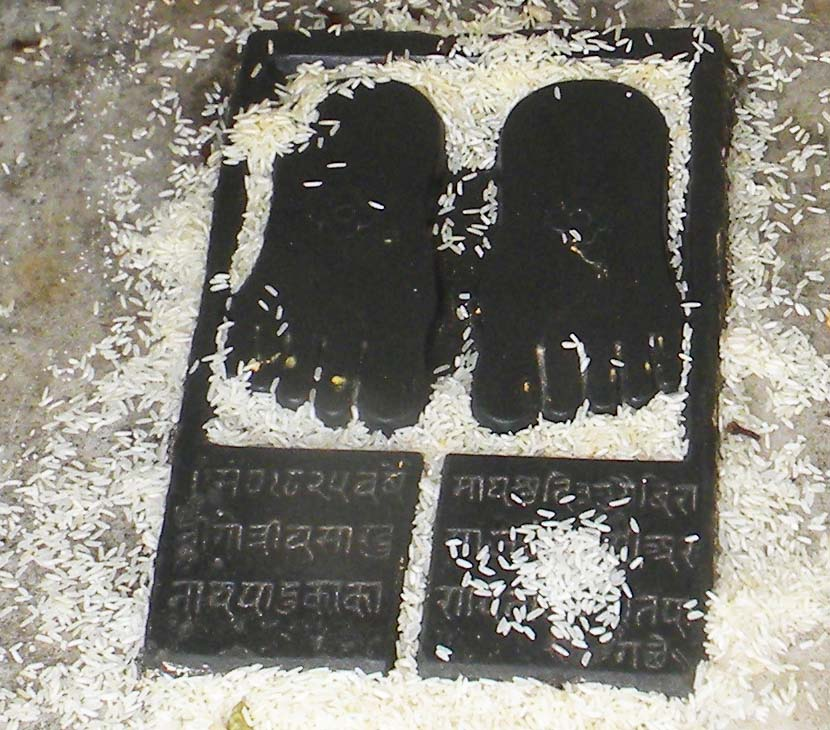
Footprints at Aranath Tonk, Shikhar Ji

== See also ==
- God in Jainism
- Arihant (Jainism)
- Jainism and non-creationism
