= Priti (goddess) =

Hindu goddess of affection

- Goddess of Affection
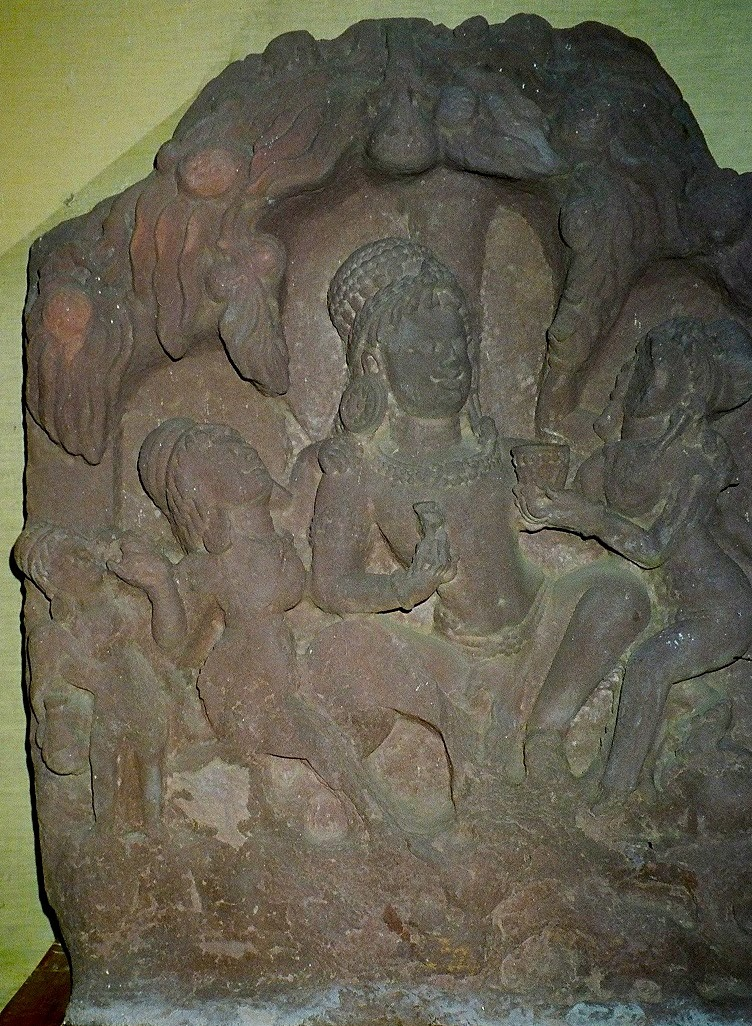
- Kamadeva with Rati and Priti, c. 8th-9th century, Vidisha Museum
- Abode: Kamaloka
- Texts: Skanda Purana, Garuda Purana
- Consort: Kamadeva

Priti (Sanskrit: प्रीति, romanized: prīti, lit. 'joy'), also known as Karnotpala, is a Hindu goddess. She is one of the two consorts of the god of love, Kamadeva, along with Rati.

Priti is regarded to represent affectionate love, while her co-wife, Rati, represents sensual pleasure. In other interpretations, Priti is regarded to be merely an epithet of Rati.

== Legend ==
According to legend, Priti joined her father in taking up austere practices to propitiate Parvati, in the hope that she may find a suitable husband despite the fact that she was beyond her prime. Thus propitiated, the goddess appeared before Priti and prescribed her a ritual that would restore her youth and allow her to gain a husband. As Priti performed the ritual, Parvati encouraged Kamadeva to meet the newly youthful Priti, causing him to fall in love with her. When Kamadeva proposes marriage, Priti asks him to seek her father's consent. Priti weds Kamadeva to become his second consort.

She is also described to be an aspect of Vishnu's divine feminine energy.

Priti accompanies her consort, Kamadeva, in his quest to disturb the penance of the deity Shiva, in order to cause him to fall in love with Parvati.

The Garuda Purana prescribes the worship of Priti alongside Kamadeva and Rati.
