= Priti Rijal =

Nepali tennis player

- Country (sports): Nepal
- Residence: Kathmandu, Nepal, Nepal
- Born: December 25, 1991 (age 33); Biratnagar, Nepal
- Height: 1.65 m (5 ft 5 in)

Priti Rijal (Nepali: प्रीति रिजाल), (born December 25, 1991) is a nationally ranked Nepali professional tennis player. She was awarded the Tennis scholarship from Collin College, Texas, USA. She was appointed as a Brand Ambassador of Universal Access for Children Affected by Aids in Nepal (UCAAN), in 2010.

== Early life ==
Priti Rijal was born in Biratnagar, Nepal. Her elder brother Utsav Rijal is also a professional lawn tennis player.

== Tennis career ==
She started playing tennis from the age of 12. She has participated in many national and international tennis championships. She also coached at Eagle Fustar in Fremont, CA for several months. Currently, she is working as an agent for ACN, a Multi Level Marketing (MLM) company in Bay Area, San Francisco, USA.

== Career statistics and awards ==
=== Singles: 5 finals ===
Outcome	Year	Championship
Winner	2007	(Nepal) 8th NIB Open Tennis Tournament
Winner	2008	(Nepal) 1st APF Tennis Tournament
Winner	2009	(Nepal) 9th NIB Open Tennis Tournament
Winner	2009	(Nepal) 5th National Games
Winner	2009	(Nepal) 2nd APF Tennis Tournament
